

239001–239100 

|-bgcolor=#fefefe
| 239001 ||  || — || February 3, 2006 || Socorro || LINEAR || — || align=right | 1.1 km || 
|-id=002 bgcolor=#fefefe
| 239002 ||  || — || February 3, 2006 || Mount Lemmon || Mount Lemmon Survey || — || align=right | 1.5 km || 
|-id=003 bgcolor=#fefefe
| 239003 ||  || — || February 3, 2006 || Mount Lemmon || Mount Lemmon Survey || NYS || align=right data-sort-value="0.84" | 840 m || 
|-id=004 bgcolor=#E9E9E9
| 239004 ||  || — || February 20, 2006 || Mount Lemmon || Mount Lemmon Survey || — || align=right | 2.1 km || 
|-id=005 bgcolor=#fefefe
| 239005 ||  || — || February 20, 2006 || Catalina || CSS || NYS || align=right | 3.4 km || 
|-id=006 bgcolor=#fefefe
| 239006 ||  || — || February 20, 2006 || Mount Lemmon || Mount Lemmon Survey || — || align=right | 3.8 km || 
|-id=007 bgcolor=#fefefe
| 239007 ||  || — || February 20, 2006 || Catalina || CSS || — || align=right | 1.4 km || 
|-id=008 bgcolor=#fefefe
| 239008 ||  || — || February 20, 2006 || Kitt Peak || Spacewatch || MAS || align=right | 1.3 km || 
|-id=009 bgcolor=#E9E9E9
| 239009 ||  || — || February 20, 2006 || Kitt Peak || Spacewatch || HOF || align=right | 3.3 km || 
|-id=010 bgcolor=#fefefe
| 239010 ||  || — || February 20, 2006 || Kitt Peak || Spacewatch || V || align=right data-sort-value="0.71" | 710 m || 
|-id=011 bgcolor=#E9E9E9
| 239011 ||  || — || February 20, 2006 || Mount Lemmon || Mount Lemmon Survey || — || align=right | 1.3 km || 
|-id=012 bgcolor=#fefefe
| 239012 ||  || — || February 21, 2006 || Mount Lemmon || Mount Lemmon Survey || — || align=right | 1.2 km || 
|-id=013 bgcolor=#fefefe
| 239013 ||  || — || February 21, 2006 || Mount Lemmon || Mount Lemmon Survey || NYS || align=right data-sort-value="0.79" | 790 m || 
|-id=014 bgcolor=#fefefe
| 239014 ||  || — || February 24, 2006 || Catalina || CSS || — || align=right | 2.5 km || 
|-id=015 bgcolor=#E9E9E9
| 239015 ||  || — || February 20, 2006 || Mount Lemmon || Mount Lemmon Survey || — || align=right | 1.2 km || 
|-id=016 bgcolor=#fefefe
| 239016 ||  || — || February 22, 2006 || Socorro || LINEAR || — || align=right | 2.9 km || 
|-id=017 bgcolor=#E9E9E9
| 239017 ||  || — || February 24, 2006 || Kitt Peak || Spacewatch || — || align=right | 1.1 km || 
|-id=018 bgcolor=#fefefe
| 239018 ||  || — || February 24, 2006 || Kitt Peak || Spacewatch || V || align=right data-sort-value="0.93" | 930 m || 
|-id=019 bgcolor=#E9E9E9
| 239019 ||  || — || February 24, 2006 || Kitt Peak || Spacewatch || — || align=right | 1.1 km || 
|-id=020 bgcolor=#fefefe
| 239020 ||  || — || February 25, 2006 || Mount Lemmon || Mount Lemmon Survey || V || align=right | 1.0 km || 
|-id=021 bgcolor=#fefefe
| 239021 ||  || — || February 25, 2006 || Kitt Peak || Spacewatch || — || align=right | 1.0 km || 
|-id=022 bgcolor=#fefefe
| 239022 ||  || — || February 25, 2006 || Mount Lemmon || Mount Lemmon Survey || — || align=right | 1.2 km || 
|-id=023 bgcolor=#E9E9E9
| 239023 ||  || — || February 25, 2006 || Kitt Peak || Spacewatch || NEM || align=right | 2.8 km || 
|-id=024 bgcolor=#E9E9E9
| 239024 ||  || — || February 25, 2006 || Socorro || LINEAR || PAE || align=right | 4.0 km || 
|-id=025 bgcolor=#E9E9E9
| 239025 ||  || — || February 25, 2006 || Mount Lemmon || Mount Lemmon Survey || KRM || align=right | 3.3 km || 
|-id=026 bgcolor=#E9E9E9
| 239026 ||  || — || February 27, 2006 || Kitt Peak || Spacewatch || — || align=right | 2.7 km || 
|-id=027 bgcolor=#E9E9E9
| 239027 ||  || — || February 27, 2006 || Kitt Peak || Spacewatch || DOR || align=right | 3.8 km || 
|-id=028 bgcolor=#fefefe
| 239028 ||  || — || February 22, 2006 || Catalina || CSS || — || align=right | 1.1 km || 
|-id=029 bgcolor=#fefefe
| 239029 ||  || — || February 22, 2006 || Anderson Mesa || LONEOS || V || align=right data-sort-value="0.89" | 890 m || 
|-id=030 bgcolor=#fefefe
| 239030 ||  || — || February 24, 2006 || Mount Lemmon || Mount Lemmon Survey || NYS || align=right data-sort-value="0.78" | 780 m || 
|-id=031 bgcolor=#fefefe
| 239031 ||  || — || February 25, 2006 || Kitt Peak || Spacewatch || — || align=right | 1.0 km || 
|-id=032 bgcolor=#fefefe
| 239032 ||  || — || February 25, 2006 || Kitt Peak || Spacewatch || — || align=right | 1.2 km || 
|-id=033 bgcolor=#fefefe
| 239033 ||  || — || February 25, 2006 || Kitt Peak || Spacewatch || — || align=right data-sort-value="0.91" | 910 m || 
|-id=034 bgcolor=#E9E9E9
| 239034 ||  || — || February 25, 2006 || Kitt Peak || Spacewatch || — || align=right | 3.6 km || 
|-id=035 bgcolor=#E9E9E9
| 239035 ||  || — || February 25, 2006 || Mount Lemmon || Mount Lemmon Survey || — || align=right | 1.5 km || 
|-id=036 bgcolor=#E9E9E9
| 239036 ||  || — || February 25, 2006 || Kitt Peak || Spacewatch || — || align=right | 2.3 km || 
|-id=037 bgcolor=#fefefe
| 239037 ||  || — || February 25, 2006 || Kitt Peak || Spacewatch || MAS || align=right | 1.5 km || 
|-id=038 bgcolor=#fefefe
| 239038 ||  || — || February 27, 2006 || Kitt Peak || Spacewatch || MAS || align=right data-sort-value="0.84" | 840 m || 
|-id=039 bgcolor=#fefefe
| 239039 ||  || — || February 27, 2006 || Socorro || LINEAR || NYS || align=right data-sort-value="0.83" | 830 m || 
|-id=040 bgcolor=#fefefe
| 239040 ||  || — || February 27, 2006 || Kitt Peak || Spacewatch || MAS || align=right data-sort-value="0.90" | 900 m || 
|-id=041 bgcolor=#fefefe
| 239041 ||  || — || February 27, 2006 || Kitt Peak || Spacewatch || V || align=right data-sort-value="0.93" | 930 m || 
|-id=042 bgcolor=#fefefe
| 239042 ||  || — || February 27, 2006 || Kitt Peak || Spacewatch || NYS || align=right data-sort-value="0.86" | 860 m || 
|-id=043 bgcolor=#fefefe
| 239043 ||  || — || February 26, 2006 || Anderson Mesa || LONEOS || — || align=right | 2.8 km || 
|-id=044 bgcolor=#fefefe
| 239044 ||  || — || February 20, 2006 || Socorro || LINEAR || — || align=right | 1.6 km || 
|-id=045 bgcolor=#fefefe
| 239045 ||  || — || February 22, 2006 || Catalina || CSS || — || align=right | 1.3 km || 
|-id=046 bgcolor=#fefefe
| 239046 Judysyd ||  ||  || February 25, 2006 || USNO Flagstaff || S. Levine, A. Henden || — || align=right | 1.3 km || 
|-id=047 bgcolor=#fefefe
| 239047 ||  || — || February 27, 2006 || Kitt Peak || Spacewatch || NYS || align=right data-sort-value="0.86" | 860 m || 
|-id=048 bgcolor=#fefefe
| 239048 ||  || — || March 2, 2006 || Mount Lemmon || Mount Lemmon Survey || MAS || align=right | 1.2 km || 
|-id=049 bgcolor=#fefefe
| 239049 ||  || — || March 4, 2006 || Anderson Mesa || LONEOS || — || align=right | 1.3 km || 
|-id=050 bgcolor=#fefefe
| 239050 ||  || — || March 4, 2006 || Kitt Peak || Spacewatch || — || align=right | 1.3 km || 
|-id=051 bgcolor=#E9E9E9
| 239051 ||  || — || March 4, 2006 || Catalina || CSS || — || align=right | 3.9 km || 
|-id=052 bgcolor=#fefefe
| 239052 ||  || — || March 4, 2006 || Kitt Peak || Spacewatch || NYS || align=right data-sort-value="0.72" | 720 m || 
|-id=053 bgcolor=#fefefe
| 239053 ||  || — || March 4, 2006 || Kitt Peak || Spacewatch || — || align=right | 1.0 km || 
|-id=054 bgcolor=#E9E9E9
| 239054 ||  || — || March 4, 2006 || Kitt Peak || Spacewatch || — || align=right | 1.1 km || 
|-id=055 bgcolor=#E9E9E9
| 239055 ||  || — || March 5, 2006 || Catalina || CSS || BAR || align=right | 2.8 km || 
|-id=056 bgcolor=#E9E9E9
| 239056 ||  || — || March 5, 2006 || Kitt Peak || Spacewatch || — || align=right | 1.8 km || 
|-id=057 bgcolor=#E9E9E9
| 239057 ||  || — || March 23, 2006 || Kitt Peak || Spacewatch || — || align=right | 2.7 km || 
|-id=058 bgcolor=#E9E9E9
| 239058 ||  || — || March 24, 2006 || Mount Lemmon || Mount Lemmon Survey || AST || align=right | 3.1 km || 
|-id=059 bgcolor=#fefefe
| 239059 ||  || — || March 23, 2006 || Kitt Peak || Spacewatch || V || align=right | 1.0 km || 
|-id=060 bgcolor=#E9E9E9
| 239060 ||  || — || March 24, 2006 || Kitt Peak || Spacewatch || — || align=right | 1.3 km || 
|-id=061 bgcolor=#E9E9E9
| 239061 ||  || — || March 25, 2006 || Mount Lemmon || Mount Lemmon Survey || — || align=right data-sort-value="0.98" | 980 m || 
|-id=062 bgcolor=#E9E9E9
| 239062 ||  || — || March 23, 2006 || Catalina || CSS || JUN || align=right | 1.9 km || 
|-id=063 bgcolor=#fefefe
| 239063 ||  || — || March 25, 2006 || Kitt Peak || Spacewatch || NYS || align=right data-sort-value="0.81" | 810 m || 
|-id=064 bgcolor=#E9E9E9
| 239064 ||  || — || March 26, 2006 || Mount Lemmon || Mount Lemmon Survey || MRX || align=right | 1.2 km || 
|-id=065 bgcolor=#fefefe
| 239065 ||  || — || March 24, 2006 || Anderson Mesa || LONEOS || — || align=right | 1.4 km || 
|-id=066 bgcolor=#fefefe
| 239066 ||  || — || March 26, 2006 || Anderson Mesa || LONEOS || NYS || align=right data-sort-value="0.90" | 900 m || 
|-id=067 bgcolor=#E9E9E9
| 239067 ||  || — || March 31, 2006 || Kitt Peak || Spacewatch || HOF || align=right | 4.3 km || 
|-id=068 bgcolor=#E9E9E9
| 239068 ||  || — || March 23, 2006 || Mount Lemmon || Mount Lemmon Survey || — || align=right | 2.3 km || 
|-id=069 bgcolor=#E9E9E9
| 239069 ||  || — || March 26, 2006 || Mount Lemmon || Mount Lemmon Survey || — || align=right | 1.2 km || 
|-id=070 bgcolor=#E9E9E9
| 239070 ||  || — || March 25, 2006 || Kitt Peak || Spacewatch || MAR || align=right | 1.5 km || 
|-id=071 bgcolor=#fefefe
| 239071 Penghu || 2006 GF ||  || April 1, 2006 || Lulin Observatory || H.-C. Lin, Q.-z. Ye || SUL || align=right | 2.7 km || 
|-id=072 bgcolor=#E9E9E9
| 239072 ||  || — || April 2, 2006 || Kitt Peak || Spacewatch || — || align=right | 2.8 km || 
|-id=073 bgcolor=#E9E9E9
| 239073 ||  || — || April 2, 2006 || Kitt Peak || Spacewatch || — || align=right | 2.6 km || 
|-id=074 bgcolor=#fefefe
| 239074 ||  || — || April 2, 2006 || Kitt Peak || Spacewatch || — || align=right | 1.3 km || 
|-id=075 bgcolor=#E9E9E9
| 239075 ||  || — || April 2, 2006 || Kitt Peak || Spacewatch || — || align=right | 1.5 km || 
|-id=076 bgcolor=#E9E9E9
| 239076 ||  || — || April 2, 2006 || Kitt Peak || Spacewatch || — || align=right | 1.5 km || 
|-id=077 bgcolor=#E9E9E9
| 239077 ||  || — || April 2, 2006 || Kitt Peak || Spacewatch || — || align=right | 1.8 km || 
|-id=078 bgcolor=#d6d6d6
| 239078 ||  || — || April 8, 2006 || Mount Lemmon || Mount Lemmon Survey || KOR || align=right | 3.2 km || 
|-id=079 bgcolor=#E9E9E9
| 239079 ||  || — || April 6, 2006 || Catalina || CSS || — || align=right | 2.8 km || 
|-id=080 bgcolor=#fefefe
| 239080 ||  || — || April 7, 2006 || Mount Lemmon || Mount Lemmon Survey || MAS || align=right | 1.0 km || 
|-id=081 bgcolor=#E9E9E9
| 239081 ||  || — || April 6, 2006 || Siding Spring || SSS || JUN || align=right | 2.1 km || 
|-id=082 bgcolor=#E9E9E9
| 239082 ||  || — || April 2, 2006 || Catalina || CSS || GER || align=right | 2.6 km || 
|-id=083 bgcolor=#E9E9E9
| 239083 ||  || — || April 6, 2006 || Socorro || LINEAR || — || align=right | 1.4 km || 
|-id=084 bgcolor=#E9E9E9
| 239084 ||  || — || April 9, 2006 || Kitt Peak || Spacewatch || — || align=right | 2.0 km || 
|-id=085 bgcolor=#E9E9E9
| 239085 ||  || — || April 7, 2006 || Kitt Peak || Spacewatch || — || align=right | 2.0 km || 
|-id=086 bgcolor=#E9E9E9
| 239086 ||  || — || April 18, 2006 || Anderson Mesa || LONEOS || BAR || align=right | 1.5 km || 
|-id=087 bgcolor=#E9E9E9
| 239087 ||  || — || April 19, 2006 || Kitt Peak || Spacewatch || — || align=right | 1.8 km || 
|-id=088 bgcolor=#E9E9E9
| 239088 ||  || — || April 19, 2006 || Mount Lemmon || Mount Lemmon Survey || — || align=right | 1.2 km || 
|-id=089 bgcolor=#E9E9E9
| 239089 ||  || — || April 18, 2006 || Kitt Peak || Spacewatch || — || align=right | 1.1 km || 
|-id=090 bgcolor=#E9E9E9
| 239090 ||  || — || April 18, 2006 || Kitt Peak || Spacewatch || — || align=right | 1.5 km || 
|-id=091 bgcolor=#E9E9E9
| 239091 ||  || — || April 20, 2006 || Kitt Peak || Spacewatch || — || align=right | 1.9 km || 
|-id=092 bgcolor=#E9E9E9
| 239092 ||  || — || April 19, 2006 || Palomar || NEAT || — || align=right | 1.7 km || 
|-id=093 bgcolor=#E9E9E9
| 239093 ||  || — || April 21, 2006 || Kitt Peak || Spacewatch || — || align=right | 2.1 km || 
|-id=094 bgcolor=#E9E9E9
| 239094 ||  || — || April 21, 2006 || Kitt Peak || Spacewatch || — || align=right | 1.2 km || 
|-id=095 bgcolor=#E9E9E9
| 239095 ||  || — || April 21, 2006 || Kitt Peak || Spacewatch || — || align=right | 1.9 km || 
|-id=096 bgcolor=#E9E9E9
| 239096 ||  || — || April 24, 2006 || Mount Lemmon || Mount Lemmon Survey || — || align=right | 1.7 km || 
|-id=097 bgcolor=#E9E9E9
| 239097 ||  || — || April 24, 2006 || Kitt Peak || Spacewatch || — || align=right | 3.1 km || 
|-id=098 bgcolor=#E9E9E9
| 239098 ||  || — || April 24, 2006 || Kitt Peak || Spacewatch || — || align=right | 1.4 km || 
|-id=099 bgcolor=#E9E9E9
| 239099 ||  || — || April 24, 2006 || Anderson Mesa || LONEOS || — || align=right | 2.5 km || 
|-id=100 bgcolor=#E9E9E9
| 239100 ||  || — || April 26, 2006 || Kitt Peak || Spacewatch || — || align=right | 1.8 km || 
|}

239101–239200 

|-bgcolor=#E9E9E9
| 239101 ||  || — || April 19, 2006 || Catalina || CSS || — || align=right | 2.2 km || 
|-id=102 bgcolor=#E9E9E9
| 239102 ||  || — || April 21, 2006 || Catalina || CSS || HNS || align=right | 2.5 km || 
|-id=103 bgcolor=#E9E9E9
| 239103 ||  || — || April 22, 2006 || Siding Spring || SSS || EUN || align=right | 2.0 km || 
|-id=104 bgcolor=#E9E9E9
| 239104 ||  || — || April 19, 2006 || Anderson Mesa || LONEOS || — || align=right | 1.2 km || 
|-id=105 bgcolor=#E9E9E9
| 239105 Marcocattaneo ||  ||  || April 28, 2006 || Vallemare di Borbona || V. S. Casulli || — || align=right | 1.6 km || 
|-id=106 bgcolor=#E9E9E9
| 239106 ||  || — || April 29, 2006 || Marly || P. Kocher || — || align=right | 2.6 km || 
|-id=107 bgcolor=#fefefe
| 239107 ||  || — || April 23, 2006 || Anderson Mesa || LONEOS || — || align=right | 2.7 km || 
|-id=108 bgcolor=#E9E9E9
| 239108 ||  || — || April 25, 2006 || Kitt Peak || Spacewatch || CLO || align=right | 1.9 km || 
|-id=109 bgcolor=#E9E9E9
| 239109 ||  || — || April 25, 2006 || Kitt Peak || Spacewatch || — || align=right | 3.8 km || 
|-id=110 bgcolor=#d6d6d6
| 239110 ||  || — || April 26, 2006 || Kitt Peak || Spacewatch || — || align=right | 2.9 km || 
|-id=111 bgcolor=#d6d6d6
| 239111 ||  || — || April 26, 2006 || Kitt Peak || Spacewatch || BRA || align=right | 1.9 km || 
|-id=112 bgcolor=#E9E9E9
| 239112 ||  || — || April 26, 2006 || Kitt Peak || Spacewatch || — || align=right | 2.9 km || 
|-id=113 bgcolor=#E9E9E9
| 239113 ||  || — || April 29, 2006 || Kitt Peak || Spacewatch || — || align=right | 2.2 km || 
|-id=114 bgcolor=#E9E9E9
| 239114 ||  || — || April 26, 2006 || Anderson Mesa || LONEOS || — || align=right | 2.7 km || 
|-id=115 bgcolor=#E9E9E9
| 239115 ||  || — || April 29, 2006 || Kitt Peak || Spacewatch || — || align=right | 2.5 km || 
|-id=116 bgcolor=#d6d6d6
| 239116 ||  || — || April 29, 2006 || Kitt Peak || Spacewatch || — || align=right | 4.0 km || 
|-id=117 bgcolor=#d6d6d6
| 239117 ||  || — || April 29, 2006 || Kitt Peak || Spacewatch || — || align=right | 5.2 km || 
|-id=118 bgcolor=#E9E9E9
| 239118 ||  || — || April 30, 2006 || Kitt Peak || Spacewatch || — || align=right | 1.7 km || 
|-id=119 bgcolor=#E9E9E9
| 239119 ||  || — || April 30, 2006 || Kitt Peak || Spacewatch || — || align=right | 2.5 km || 
|-id=120 bgcolor=#E9E9E9
| 239120 ||  || — || April 25, 2006 || Catalina || CSS || — || align=right | 4.1 km || 
|-id=121 bgcolor=#E9E9E9
| 239121 ||  || — || April 26, 2006 || Siding Spring || SSS || — || align=right | 1.2 km || 
|-id=122 bgcolor=#E9E9E9
| 239122 ||  || — || April 25, 2006 || Kitt Peak || Spacewatch || KON || align=right | 4.3 km || 
|-id=123 bgcolor=#E9E9E9
| 239123 ||  || — || April 25, 2006 || Mount Lemmon || Mount Lemmon Survey || ADE || align=right | 3.8 km || 
|-id=124 bgcolor=#E9E9E9
| 239124 ||  || — || April 26, 2006 || Kitt Peak || Spacewatch || — || align=right | 2.2 km || 
|-id=125 bgcolor=#E9E9E9
| 239125 ||  || — || April 30, 2006 || Kitt Peak || Spacewatch || — || align=right | 1.9 km || 
|-id=126 bgcolor=#E9E9E9
| 239126 ||  || — || April 27, 2006 || Cerro Tololo || M. W. Buie || WIT || align=right | 1.4 km || 
|-id=127 bgcolor=#E9E9E9
| 239127 ||  || — || April 30, 2006 || Kitt Peak || Spacewatch || HOF || align=right | 2.8 km || 
|-id=128 bgcolor=#E9E9E9
| 239128 ||  || — || May 2, 2006 || Mount Lemmon || Mount Lemmon Survey || — || align=right | 1.0 km || 
|-id=129 bgcolor=#fefefe
| 239129 ||  || — || May 3, 2006 || Mount Lemmon || Mount Lemmon Survey || — || align=right | 1.1 km || 
|-id=130 bgcolor=#E9E9E9
| 239130 ||  || — || May 2, 2006 || Nyukasa || Mount Nyukasa Stn. || — || align=right | 1.1 km || 
|-id=131 bgcolor=#E9E9E9
| 239131 ||  || — || May 1, 2006 || Kitt Peak || Spacewatch || — || align=right | 1.1 km || 
|-id=132 bgcolor=#E9E9E9
| 239132 ||  || — || May 1, 2006 || Kitt Peak || Spacewatch || — || align=right | 2.7 km || 
|-id=133 bgcolor=#E9E9E9
| 239133 ||  || — || May 2, 2006 || Mount Lemmon || Mount Lemmon Survey || PAD || align=right | 1.9 km || 
|-id=134 bgcolor=#E9E9E9
| 239134 ||  || — || May 2, 2006 || Mount Lemmon || Mount Lemmon Survey || — || align=right | 3.4 km || 
|-id=135 bgcolor=#E9E9E9
| 239135 ||  || — || May 2, 2006 || Mount Lemmon || Mount Lemmon Survey || — || align=right | 1.5 km || 
|-id=136 bgcolor=#E9E9E9
| 239136 ||  || — || May 3, 2006 || Kitt Peak || Spacewatch || — || align=right | 2.3 km || 
|-id=137 bgcolor=#E9E9E9
| 239137 ||  || — || May 3, 2006 || Kitt Peak || Spacewatch || — || align=right | 1.7 km || 
|-id=138 bgcolor=#E9E9E9
| 239138 ||  || — || May 3, 2006 || Kitt Peak || Spacewatch || — || align=right | 2.0 km || 
|-id=139 bgcolor=#E9E9E9
| 239139 ||  || — || May 4, 2006 || Kitt Peak || Spacewatch || — || align=right | 1.8 km || 
|-id=140 bgcolor=#E9E9E9
| 239140 ||  || — || May 4, 2006 || Kitt Peak || Spacewatch || PAD || align=right | 2.6 km || 
|-id=141 bgcolor=#E9E9E9
| 239141 ||  || — || May 6, 2006 || Kitt Peak || Spacewatch || — || align=right | 3.7 km || 
|-id=142 bgcolor=#E9E9E9
| 239142 ||  || — || May 7, 2006 || Kitt Peak || Spacewatch || — || align=right | 3.8 km || 
|-id=143 bgcolor=#E9E9E9
| 239143 ||  || — || May 5, 2006 || Kitt Peak || Spacewatch || — || align=right | 1.1 km || 
|-id=144 bgcolor=#E9E9E9
| 239144 ||  || — || May 6, 2006 || Kitt Peak || Spacewatch || — || align=right | 2.2 km || 
|-id=145 bgcolor=#E9E9E9
| 239145 ||  || — || May 7, 2006 || Mount Lemmon || Mount Lemmon Survey || — || align=right | 1.5 km || 
|-id=146 bgcolor=#E9E9E9
| 239146 ||  || — || May 9, 2006 || Mount Lemmon || Mount Lemmon Survey || — || align=right | 1.3 km || 
|-id=147 bgcolor=#E9E9E9
| 239147 ||  || — || May 8, 2006 || Siding Spring || SSS || ADE || align=right | 1.9 km || 
|-id=148 bgcolor=#E9E9E9
| 239148 ||  || — || May 6, 2006 || Mount Lemmon || Mount Lemmon Survey || — || align=right | 1.5 km || 
|-id=149 bgcolor=#E9E9E9
| 239149 ||  || — || May 9, 2006 || Mount Lemmon || Mount Lemmon Survey || — || align=right | 2.1 km || 
|-id=150 bgcolor=#E9E9E9
| 239150 ||  || — || May 5, 2006 || Anderson Mesa || LONEOS || — || align=right | 1.5 km || 
|-id=151 bgcolor=#E9E9E9
| 239151 ||  || — || May 18, 2006 || Palomar || NEAT || — || align=right | 2.1 km || 
|-id=152 bgcolor=#E9E9E9
| 239152 ||  || — || May 19, 2006 || Mount Lemmon || Mount Lemmon Survey || AST || align=right | 3.0 km || 
|-id=153 bgcolor=#d6d6d6
| 239153 ||  || — || May 19, 2006 || Catalina || CSS || — || align=right | 4.0 km || 
|-id=154 bgcolor=#E9E9E9
| 239154 ||  || — || May 19, 2006 || Catalina || CSS || — || align=right | 2.2 km || 
|-id=155 bgcolor=#E9E9E9
| 239155 ||  || — || May 19, 2006 || Mount Lemmon || Mount Lemmon Survey || EUN || align=right | 1.7 km || 
|-id=156 bgcolor=#E9E9E9
| 239156 ||  || — || May 20, 2006 || Kitt Peak || Spacewatch || — || align=right | 2.1 km || 
|-id=157 bgcolor=#E9E9E9
| 239157 ||  || — || May 20, 2006 || Palomar || NEAT || — || align=right | 1.6 km || 
|-id=158 bgcolor=#E9E9E9
| 239158 ||  || — || May 20, 2006 || Mount Lemmon || Mount Lemmon Survey || EUN || align=right | 2.0 km || 
|-id=159 bgcolor=#d6d6d6
| 239159 ||  || — || May 20, 2006 || Palomar || NEAT || — || align=right | 7.5 km || 
|-id=160 bgcolor=#E9E9E9
| 239160 ||  || — || May 21, 2006 || Kitt Peak || Spacewatch || AER || align=right | 2.0 km || 
|-id=161 bgcolor=#E9E9E9
| 239161 ||  || — || May 20, 2006 || Anderson Mesa || LONEOS || — || align=right | 3.5 km || 
|-id=162 bgcolor=#E9E9E9
| 239162 ||  || — || May 20, 2006 || Kitt Peak || Spacewatch || — || align=right | 3.2 km || 
|-id=163 bgcolor=#E9E9E9
| 239163 ||  || — || May 20, 2006 || Kitt Peak || Spacewatch || JUN || align=right | 3.1 km || 
|-id=164 bgcolor=#E9E9E9
| 239164 ||  || — || May 20, 2006 || Kitt Peak || Spacewatch || AGN || align=right | 1.4 km || 
|-id=165 bgcolor=#E9E9E9
| 239165 ||  || — || May 22, 2006 || Kitt Peak || Spacewatch || — || align=right | 4.0 km || 
|-id=166 bgcolor=#E9E9E9
| 239166 ||  || — || May 19, 2006 || Catalina || CSS || — || align=right | 2.2 km || 
|-id=167 bgcolor=#E9E9E9
| 239167 ||  || — || May 21, 2006 || Mount Lemmon || Mount Lemmon Survey || — || align=right | 2.0 km || 
|-id=168 bgcolor=#E9E9E9
| 239168 ||  || — || May 21, 2006 || Mount Lemmon || Mount Lemmon Survey || — || align=right | 2.4 km || 
|-id=169 bgcolor=#E9E9E9
| 239169 ||  || — || May 21, 2006 || Kitt Peak || Spacewatch || — || align=right | 1.5 km || 
|-id=170 bgcolor=#E9E9E9
| 239170 ||  || — || May 21, 2006 || Kitt Peak || Spacewatch || WIT || align=right | 1.1 km || 
|-id=171 bgcolor=#E9E9E9
| 239171 ||  || — || May 21, 2006 || Kitt Peak || Spacewatch || HEN || align=right | 1.2 km || 
|-id=172 bgcolor=#E9E9E9
| 239172 ||  || — || May 21, 2006 || Kitt Peak || Spacewatch || — || align=right | 2.5 km || 
|-id=173 bgcolor=#d6d6d6
| 239173 ||  || — || May 21, 2006 || Mount Lemmon || Mount Lemmon Survey || VER || align=right | 4.7 km || 
|-id=174 bgcolor=#E9E9E9
| 239174 ||  || — || May 22, 2006 || Kitt Peak || Spacewatch || — || align=right | 1.5 km || 
|-id=175 bgcolor=#E9E9E9
| 239175 ||  || — || May 22, 2006 || Siding Spring || SSS || — || align=right | 2.1 km || 
|-id=176 bgcolor=#E9E9E9
| 239176 ||  || — || May 24, 2006 || Kitt Peak || Spacewatch || WIT || align=right | 1.4 km || 
|-id=177 bgcolor=#E9E9E9
| 239177 ||  || — || May 22, 2006 || Kitt Peak || Spacewatch || — || align=right | 2.2 km || 
|-id=178 bgcolor=#E9E9E9
| 239178 ||  || — || May 23, 2006 || Kitt Peak || Spacewatch || — || align=right | 4.0 km || 
|-id=179 bgcolor=#E9E9E9
| 239179 ||  || — || May 24, 2006 || Palomar || NEAT || RAF || align=right | 1.6 km || 
|-id=180 bgcolor=#E9E9E9
| 239180 ||  || — || May 24, 2006 || Mount Lemmon || Mount Lemmon Survey || — || align=right | 3.2 km || 
|-id=181 bgcolor=#E9E9E9
| 239181 ||  || — || May 24, 2006 || Mount Lemmon || Mount Lemmon Survey || — || align=right | 2.4 km || 
|-id=182 bgcolor=#E9E9E9
| 239182 ||  || — || May 21, 2006 || Mount Lemmon || Mount Lemmon Survey || — || align=right | 1.6 km || 
|-id=183 bgcolor=#E9E9E9
| 239183 ||  || — || May 21, 2006 || Palomar || NEAT || — || align=right | 1.6 km || 
|-id=184 bgcolor=#E9E9E9
| 239184 ||  || — || May 25, 2006 || Kitt Peak || Spacewatch || MRX || align=right | 1.2 km || 
|-id=185 bgcolor=#E9E9E9
| 239185 ||  || — || May 25, 2006 || Kitt Peak || Spacewatch || — || align=right | 1.0 km || 
|-id=186 bgcolor=#E9E9E9
| 239186 ||  || — || May 29, 2006 || Siding Spring || SSS || — || align=right | 1.5 km || 
|-id=187 bgcolor=#E9E9E9
| 239187 ||  || — || May 24, 2006 || Palomar || NEAT || — || align=right | 2.6 km || 
|-id=188 bgcolor=#d6d6d6
| 239188 ||  || — || May 29, 2006 || Kitt Peak || Spacewatch || URS || align=right | 5.0 km || 
|-id=189 bgcolor=#d6d6d6
| 239189 ||  || — || May 30, 2006 || Nyukasa || Mount Nyukasa Stn. || VER || align=right | 4.7 km || 
|-id=190 bgcolor=#d6d6d6
| 239190 ||  || — || May 28, 2006 || Kitt Peak || Spacewatch || EOS || align=right | 5.4 km || 
|-id=191 bgcolor=#E9E9E9
| 239191 ||  || — || May 28, 2006 || Kitt Peak || Spacewatch || HEN || align=right | 1.4 km || 
|-id=192 bgcolor=#E9E9E9
| 239192 ||  || — || May 27, 2006 || Catalina || CSS || — || align=right | 3.3 km || 
|-id=193 bgcolor=#E9E9E9
| 239193 ||  || — || May 28, 2006 || Kitt Peak || Spacewatch || — || align=right | 2.6 km || 
|-id=194 bgcolor=#E9E9E9
| 239194 ||  || — || May 26, 2006 || Palomar || NEAT || — || align=right | 1.9 km || 
|-id=195 bgcolor=#d6d6d6
| 239195 || 2006 LN || — || June 1, 2006 || Reedy Creek || J. Broughton || — || align=right | 5.8 km || 
|-id=196 bgcolor=#E9E9E9
| 239196 ||  || — || June 7, 2006 || Siding Spring || SSS || EUN || align=right | 2.3 km || 
|-id=197 bgcolor=#E9E9E9
| 239197 ||  || — || June 18, 2006 || Palomar || NEAT || — || align=right | 3.6 km || 
|-id=198 bgcolor=#E9E9E9
| 239198 ||  || — || June 17, 2006 || Kitt Peak || Spacewatch || DOR || align=right | 4.0 km || 
|-id=199 bgcolor=#d6d6d6
| 239199 ||  || — || June 21, 2006 || Palomar || NEAT || — || align=right | 2.9 km || 
|-id=200 bgcolor=#E9E9E9
| 239200 Luoyang ||  ||  || June 23, 2006 || Lulin Observatory || Q.-z. Ye, T.-C. Yang || AEO || align=right | 1.7 km || 
|}

239201–239300 

|-bgcolor=#d6d6d6
| 239201 ||  || — || June 23, 2006 || Lulin || Q.-z. Ye || KAR || align=right | 1.3 km || 
|-id=202 bgcolor=#d6d6d6
| 239202 || 2006 OX || — || July 19, 2006 || Bergisch Gladbach || W. Bickel || — || align=right | 4.1 km || 
|-id=203 bgcolor=#E9E9E9
| 239203 Simeon ||  ||  || July 27, 2006 || Zvezdno Obshtestvo || F. Fratev || — || align=right | 3.0 km || 
|-id=204 bgcolor=#E9E9E9
| 239204 ||  || — || July 19, 2006 || Lulin Observatory || LUSS || — || align=right | 2.1 km || 
|-id=205 bgcolor=#d6d6d6
| 239205 ||  || — || July 18, 2006 || Siding Spring || SSS || — || align=right | 5.7 km || 
|-id=206 bgcolor=#E9E9E9
| 239206 ||  || — || July 20, 2006 || Siding Spring || SSS || EUN || align=right | 2.1 km || 
|-id=207 bgcolor=#E9E9E9
| 239207 ||  || — || August 13, 2006 || Palomar || NEAT || — || align=right | 2.1 km || 
|-id=208 bgcolor=#E9E9E9
| 239208 ||  || — || August 13, 2006 || Siding Spring || SSS || — || align=right | 1.6 km || 
|-id=209 bgcolor=#E9E9E9
| 239209 ||  || — || August 14, 2006 || Siding Spring || SSS || — || align=right | 2.0 km || 
|-id=210 bgcolor=#E9E9E9
| 239210 ||  || — || August 14, 2006 || Palomar || NEAT || — || align=right | 2.0 km || 
|-id=211 bgcolor=#E9E9E9
| 239211 ||  || — || August 22, 2006 || Hibiscus || S. F. Hönig || TIN || align=right | 2.4 km || 
|-id=212 bgcolor=#d6d6d6
| 239212 ||  || — || August 19, 2006 || Kitt Peak || Spacewatch || — || align=right | 2.7 km || 
|-id=213 bgcolor=#d6d6d6
| 239213 ||  || — || August 22, 2006 || Palomar || NEAT || SHU3:2 || align=right | 8.0 km || 
|-id=214 bgcolor=#d6d6d6
| 239214 ||  || — || August 18, 2006 || Kitt Peak || Spacewatch || — || align=right | 3.0 km || 
|-id=215 bgcolor=#E9E9E9
| 239215 ||  || — || August 22, 2006 || Palomar || NEAT || — || align=right | 2.2 km || 
|-id=216 bgcolor=#d6d6d6
| 239216 ||  || — || August 28, 2006 || Catalina || CSS || — || align=right | 4.1 km || 
|-id=217 bgcolor=#d6d6d6
| 239217 ||  || — || August 19, 2006 || Kitt Peak || Spacewatch || VER || align=right | 4.8 km || 
|-id=218 bgcolor=#d6d6d6
| 239218 ||  || — || August 27, 2006 || Anderson Mesa || LONEOS || EOS || align=right | 2.6 km || 
|-id=219 bgcolor=#d6d6d6
| 239219 ||  || — || September 14, 2006 || Kitt Peak || Spacewatch || — || align=right | 4.3 km || 
|-id=220 bgcolor=#d6d6d6
| 239220 ||  || — || September 14, 2006 || Kitt Peak || Spacewatch || — || align=right | 3.9 km || 
|-id=221 bgcolor=#d6d6d6
| 239221 ||  || — || September 15, 2006 || Kitt Peak || Spacewatch || — || align=right | 3.6 km || 
|-id=222 bgcolor=#d6d6d6
| 239222 ||  || — || September 15, 2006 || Kitt Peak || Spacewatch || VER || align=right | 4.2 km || 
|-id=223 bgcolor=#d6d6d6
| 239223 ||  || — || September 16, 2006 || Socorro || LINEAR || — || align=right | 4.5 km || 
|-id=224 bgcolor=#d6d6d6
| 239224 ||  || — || September 17, 2006 || Anderson Mesa || LONEOS || — || align=right | 4.0 km || 
|-id=225 bgcolor=#d6d6d6
| 239225 ||  || — || September 17, 2006 || Kitt Peak || Spacewatch || THM || align=right | 3.1 km || 
|-id=226 bgcolor=#d6d6d6
| 239226 ||  || — || September 18, 2006 || Kitt Peak || Spacewatch || THM || align=right | 3.1 km || 
|-id=227 bgcolor=#d6d6d6
| 239227 ||  || — || September 18, 2006 || Catalina || CSS || — || align=right | 6.3 km || 
|-id=228 bgcolor=#E9E9E9
| 239228 ||  || — || September 19, 2006 || Socorro || LINEAR || DOR || align=right | 4.6 km || 
|-id=229 bgcolor=#d6d6d6
| 239229 ||  || — || September 18, 2006 || Catalina || CSS || — || align=right | 4.1 km || 
|-id=230 bgcolor=#d6d6d6
| 239230 ||  || — || September 18, 2006 || Kitt Peak || Spacewatch || — || align=right | 5.8 km || 
|-id=231 bgcolor=#d6d6d6
| 239231 ||  || — || September 22, 2006 || Socorro || LINEAR || — || align=right | 3.0 km || 
|-id=232 bgcolor=#d6d6d6
| 239232 ||  || — || September 18, 2006 || Catalina || CSS || HYG || align=right | 4.8 km || 
|-id=233 bgcolor=#d6d6d6
| 239233 ||  || — || September 19, 2006 || Anderson Mesa || LONEOS || HYG || align=right | 3.3 km || 
|-id=234 bgcolor=#d6d6d6
| 239234 ||  || — || September 25, 2006 || Anderson Mesa || LONEOS || MEL || align=right | 6.5 km || 
|-id=235 bgcolor=#d6d6d6
| 239235 ||  || — || September 25, 2006 || Kitt Peak || Spacewatch || NAE || align=right | 4.7 km || 
|-id=236 bgcolor=#d6d6d6
| 239236 ||  || — || September 25, 2006 || Kitt Peak || Spacewatch || 637 || align=right | 4.3 km || 
|-id=237 bgcolor=#d6d6d6
| 239237 ||  || — || September 26, 2006 || Kitt Peak || Spacewatch || HYG || align=right | 3.9 km || 
|-id=238 bgcolor=#d6d6d6
| 239238 ||  || — || September 26, 2006 || Mount Lemmon || Mount Lemmon Survey || — || align=right | 2.2 km || 
|-id=239 bgcolor=#d6d6d6
| 239239 ||  || — || September 25, 2006 || Kitt Peak || Spacewatch || — || align=right | 5.4 km || 
|-id=240 bgcolor=#d6d6d6
| 239240 ||  || — || September 27, 2006 || Kitt Peak || Spacewatch || — || align=right | 3.2 km || 
|-id=241 bgcolor=#d6d6d6
| 239241 ||  || — || September 30, 2006 || Catalina || CSS || HYG || align=right | 3.9 km || 
|-id=242 bgcolor=#d6d6d6
| 239242 ||  || — || September 27, 2006 || Apache Point || A. C. Becker || — || align=right | 4.5 km || 
|-id=243 bgcolor=#d6d6d6
| 239243 ||  || — || October 4, 2006 || Mount Lemmon || Mount Lemmon Survey || — || align=right | 3.6 km || 
|-id=244 bgcolor=#d6d6d6
| 239244 ||  || — || October 12, 2006 || Kitt Peak || Spacewatch || — || align=right | 5.1 km || 
|-id=245 bgcolor=#d6d6d6
| 239245 ||  || — || October 12, 2006 || Kitt Peak || Spacewatch || HYG || align=right | 4.2 km || 
|-id=246 bgcolor=#d6d6d6
| 239246 ||  || — || October 13, 2006 || Kitt Peak || Spacewatch || VER || align=right | 4.8 km || 
|-id=247 bgcolor=#d6d6d6
| 239247 ||  || — || October 11, 2006 || Palomar || NEAT || — || align=right | 5.8 km || 
|-id=248 bgcolor=#d6d6d6
| 239248 ||  || — || October 15, 2006 || Catalina || CSS || 7:4 || align=right | 6.5 km || 
|-id=249 bgcolor=#d6d6d6
| 239249 ||  || — || October 16, 2006 || Catalina || CSS || — || align=right | 3.6 km || 
|-id=250 bgcolor=#d6d6d6
| 239250 ||  || — || October 19, 2006 || Kitt Peak || Spacewatch || THB || align=right | 4.5 km || 
|-id=251 bgcolor=#d6d6d6
| 239251 ||  || — || October 19, 2006 || Kitt Peak || Spacewatch || URS || align=right | 4.8 km || 
|-id=252 bgcolor=#d6d6d6
| 239252 ||  || — || October 21, 2006 || Catalina || CSS || — || align=right | 5.4 km || 
|-id=253 bgcolor=#d6d6d6
| 239253 ||  || — || October 27, 2006 || Mount Lemmon || Mount Lemmon Survey || MRC || align=right | 3.2 km || 
|-id=254 bgcolor=#d6d6d6
| 239254 ||  || — || October 19, 2006 || Kitt Peak || M. W. Buie || EOS || align=right | 2.2 km || 
|-id=255 bgcolor=#d6d6d6
| 239255 ||  || — || October 21, 2006 || Apache Point || A. C. Becker || — || align=right | 4.1 km || 
|-id=256 bgcolor=#d6d6d6
| 239256 ||  || — || November 10, 2006 || Kitt Peak || Spacewatch || TEL || align=right | 5.3 km || 
|-id=257 bgcolor=#d6d6d6
| 239257 ||  || — || December 17, 2006 || Mount Lemmon || Mount Lemmon Survey || — || align=right | 6.2 km || 
|-id=258 bgcolor=#fefefe
| 239258 ||  || — || February 17, 2007 || Kitt Peak || Spacewatch || — || align=right | 2.0 km || 
|-id=259 bgcolor=#fefefe
| 239259 ||  || — || February 19, 2007 || Mount Lemmon || Mount Lemmon Survey || FLO || align=right data-sort-value="0.80" | 800 m || 
|-id=260 bgcolor=#fefefe
| 239260 ||  || — || February 23, 2007 || Catalina || CSS || H || align=right data-sort-value="0.71" | 710 m || 
|-id=261 bgcolor=#fefefe
| 239261 ||  || — || March 11, 2007 || Catalina || CSS || — || align=right data-sort-value="0.96" | 960 m || 
|-id=262 bgcolor=#fefefe
| 239262 ||  || — || March 11, 2007 || Mount Lemmon || Mount Lemmon Survey || ERI || align=right | 2.5 km || 
|-id=263 bgcolor=#fefefe
| 239263 ||  || — || March 9, 2007 || Mount Lemmon || Mount Lemmon Survey || FLO || align=right data-sort-value="0.60" | 600 m || 
|-id=264 bgcolor=#d6d6d6
| 239264 ||  || — || April 11, 2007 || Mount Lemmon || Mount Lemmon Survey || — || align=right | 6.5 km || 
|-id=265 bgcolor=#fefefe
| 239265 ||  || — || April 11, 2007 || Kitt Peak || Spacewatch || — || align=right data-sort-value="0.87" | 870 m || 
|-id=266 bgcolor=#fefefe
| 239266 ||  || — || April 11, 2007 || Kitt Peak || Spacewatch || — || align=right data-sort-value="0.59" | 590 m || 
|-id=267 bgcolor=#fefefe
| 239267 ||  || — || April 18, 2007 || Kitt Peak || Spacewatch || — || align=right data-sort-value="0.66" | 660 m || 
|-id=268 bgcolor=#fefefe
| 239268 ||  || — || April 26, 2007 || Kitt Peak || Spacewatch || — || align=right | 1.0 km || 
|-id=269 bgcolor=#fefefe
| 239269 ||  || — || May 7, 2007 || Kitt Peak || Spacewatch || — || align=right | 1.0 km || 
|-id=270 bgcolor=#fefefe
| 239270 ||  || — || May 11, 2007 || Siding Spring || SSS || — || align=right | 2.8 km || 
|-id=271 bgcolor=#fefefe
| 239271 ||  || — || May 9, 2007 || Catalina || CSS || — || align=right | 3.7 km || 
|-id=272 bgcolor=#fefefe
| 239272 ||  || — || May 11, 2007 || Mount Lemmon || Mount Lemmon Survey || — || align=right | 1.0 km || 
|-id=273 bgcolor=#fefefe
| 239273 ||  || — || May 17, 2007 || Catalina || CSS || V || align=right | 1.1 km || 
|-id=274 bgcolor=#fefefe
| 239274 ||  || — || May 18, 2007 || Tiki || S. F. Hönig, N. Teamo || FLO || align=right data-sort-value="0.77" | 770 m || 
|-id=275 bgcolor=#FA8072
| 239275 ||  || — || May 28, 2007 || Tiki || S. F. Hönig, N. Teamo || — || align=right | 1.5 km || 
|-id=276 bgcolor=#fefefe
| 239276 ||  || — || June 14, 2007 || Kitt Peak || Spacewatch || V || align=right data-sort-value="0.95" | 950 m || 
|-id=277 bgcolor=#fefefe
| 239277 ||  || — || July 15, 2007 || Siding Spring || SSS || V || align=right | 1.2 km || 
|-id=278 bgcolor=#E9E9E9
| 239278 || 2007 OP || — || July 17, 2007 || Eskridge || G. Hug || EUN || align=right | 1.5 km || 
|-id=279 bgcolor=#fefefe
| 239279 ||  || — || July 16, 2007 || Socorro || LINEAR || NYS || align=right data-sort-value="0.99" | 990 m || 
|-id=280 bgcolor=#fefefe
| 239280 ||  || — || July 21, 2007 || Lulin || LUSS || — || align=right | 2.2 km || 
|-id=281 bgcolor=#fefefe
| 239281 ||  || — || July 20, 2007 || Reedy Creek || J. Broughton || NYS || align=right data-sort-value="0.89" | 890 m || 
|-id=282 bgcolor=#fefefe
| 239282 Kevinmccarron ||  ||  || July 24, 2007 || Charleston || R. Holmes || — || align=right | 1.5 km || 
|-id=283 bgcolor=#fefefe
| 239283 ||  || — || August 3, 2007 || Eskridge || G. Hug || NYS || align=right data-sort-value="0.93" | 930 m || 
|-id=284 bgcolor=#fefefe
| 239284 ||  || — || August 6, 2007 || Lulin || LUSS || — || align=right | 1.0 km || 
|-id=285 bgcolor=#E9E9E9
| 239285 ||  || — || August 6, 2007 || Socorro || LINEAR || — || align=right | 3.2 km || 
|-id=286 bgcolor=#fefefe
| 239286 ||  || — || August 13, 2007 || Pla D'Arguines || R. Ferrando || V || align=right data-sort-value="0.98" | 980 m || 
|-id=287 bgcolor=#fefefe
| 239287 ||  || — || August 11, 2007 || Socorro || LINEAR || V || align=right | 1.1 km || 
|-id=288 bgcolor=#fefefe
| 239288 ||  || — || August 8, 2007 || Socorro || LINEAR || FLO || align=right | 1.0 km || 
|-id=289 bgcolor=#fefefe
| 239289 ||  || — || August 11, 2007 || Socorro || LINEAR || NYS || align=right | 1.0 km || 
|-id=290 bgcolor=#fefefe
| 239290 ||  || — || August 8, 2007 || Socorro || LINEAR || — || align=right | 2.7 km || 
|-id=291 bgcolor=#fefefe
| 239291 ||  || — || August 8, 2007 || Socorro || LINEAR || NYS || align=right data-sort-value="0.89" | 890 m || 
|-id=292 bgcolor=#fefefe
| 239292 ||  || — || August 8, 2007 || Socorro || LINEAR || NYS || align=right | 1.1 km || 
|-id=293 bgcolor=#fefefe
| 239293 ||  || — || August 8, 2007 || Socorro || LINEAR || NYS || align=right | 1.2 km || 
|-id=294 bgcolor=#fefefe
| 239294 ||  || — || August 10, 2007 || Siding Spring || SSS || — || align=right | 2.0 km || 
|-id=295 bgcolor=#fefefe
| 239295 ||  || — || August 11, 2007 || Socorro || LINEAR || NYS || align=right | 1.2 km || 
|-id=296 bgcolor=#fefefe
| 239296 ||  || — || August 11, 2007 || Anderson Mesa || LONEOS || EUT || align=right | 1.0 km || 
|-id=297 bgcolor=#fefefe
| 239297 ||  || — || August 9, 2007 || Socorro || LINEAR || MAS || align=right | 1.2 km || 
|-id=298 bgcolor=#fefefe
| 239298 ||  || — || August 12, 2007 || Socorro || LINEAR || NYS || align=right data-sort-value="0.94" | 940 m || 
|-id=299 bgcolor=#fefefe
| 239299 ||  || — || August 9, 2007 || Socorro || LINEAR || — || align=right | 1.8 km || 
|-id=300 bgcolor=#fefefe
| 239300 ||  || — || August 13, 2007 || Socorro || LINEAR || — || align=right | 1.1 km || 
|}

239301–239400 

|-bgcolor=#fefefe
| 239301 ||  || — || August 11, 2007 || Anderson Mesa || LONEOS || FLO || align=right data-sort-value="0.80" | 800 m || 
|-id=302 bgcolor=#d6d6d6
| 239302 ||  || — || August 15, 2007 || La Sagra || OAM Obs. || — || align=right | 4.7 km || 
|-id=303 bgcolor=#E9E9E9
| 239303 ||  || — || August 9, 2007 || Socorro || LINEAR || slow || align=right | 3.8 km || 
|-id=304 bgcolor=#fefefe
| 239304 ||  || — || August 11, 2007 || Socorro || LINEAR || V || align=right data-sort-value="0.92" | 920 m || 
|-id=305 bgcolor=#fefefe
| 239305 ||  || — || August 8, 2007 || Siding Spring || SSS || V || align=right | 1.4 km || 
|-id=306 bgcolor=#E9E9E9
| 239306 ||  || — || August 18, 2007 || Bergisch Gladbac || W. Bickel || — || align=right | 2.3 km || 
|-id=307 bgcolor=#fefefe
| 239307 Kruchynenko ||  ||  || August 24, 2007 || Andrushivka || Andrushivka Obs. || — || align=right | 1.7 km || 
|-id=308 bgcolor=#fefefe
| 239308 ||  || — || August 20, 2007 || Purple Mountain || PMO NEO || NYS || align=right | 1.1 km || 
|-id=309 bgcolor=#E9E9E9
| 239309 ||  || — || August 21, 2007 || Anderson Mesa || LONEOS || — || align=right | 3.0 km || 
|-id=310 bgcolor=#fefefe
| 239310 ||  || — || August 21, 2007 || Anderson Mesa || LONEOS || — || align=right | 1.4 km || 
|-id=311 bgcolor=#fefefe
| 239311 ||  || — || August 22, 2007 || Socorro || LINEAR || — || align=right | 1.0 km || 
|-id=312 bgcolor=#fefefe
| 239312 ||  || — || August 21, 2007 || Anderson Mesa || LONEOS || — || align=right | 1.3 km || 
|-id=313 bgcolor=#d6d6d6
| 239313 ||  || — || September 13, 2007 || Wrightwood || J. W. Young || — || align=right | 3.8 km || 
|-id=314 bgcolor=#d6d6d6
| 239314 ||  || — || September 3, 2007 || Catalina || CSS || — || align=right | 4.1 km || 
|-id=315 bgcolor=#E9E9E9
| 239315 ||  || — || September 3, 2007 || Catalina || CSS || — || align=right | 2.9 km || 
|-id=316 bgcolor=#d6d6d6
| 239316 ||  || — || September 4, 2007 || Catalina || CSS || — || align=right | 5.2 km || 
|-id=317 bgcolor=#fefefe
| 239317 ||  || — || September 5, 2007 || Anderson Mesa || LONEOS || — || align=right | 1.6 km || 
|-id=318 bgcolor=#E9E9E9
| 239318 ||  || — || September 6, 2007 || Anderson Mesa || LONEOS || PAD || align=right | 3.1 km || 
|-id=319 bgcolor=#fefefe
| 239319 ||  || — || September 8, 2007 || Anderson Mesa || LONEOS || NYS || align=right data-sort-value="0.95" | 950 m || 
|-id=320 bgcolor=#d6d6d6
| 239320 ||  || — || September 8, 2007 || Anderson Mesa || LONEOS || — || align=right | 4.4 km || 
|-id=321 bgcolor=#fefefe
| 239321 ||  || — || September 8, 2007 || Anderson Mesa || LONEOS || MAS || align=right data-sort-value="0.93" | 930 m || 
|-id=322 bgcolor=#d6d6d6
| 239322 ||  || — || September 9, 2007 || Kitt Peak || Spacewatch || — || align=right | 3.6 km || 
|-id=323 bgcolor=#fefefe
| 239323 ||  || — || September 9, 2007 || Anderson Mesa || LONEOS || MAS || align=right | 1.00 km || 
|-id=324 bgcolor=#E9E9E9
| 239324 ||  || — || September 9, 2007 || Anderson Mesa || LONEOS || — || align=right | 3.9 km || 
|-id=325 bgcolor=#fefefe
| 239325 ||  || — || September 9, 2007 || Anderson Mesa || LONEOS || — || align=right | 1.4 km || 
|-id=326 bgcolor=#E9E9E9
| 239326 ||  || — || September 9, 2007 || Anderson Mesa || LONEOS || — || align=right | 2.3 km || 
|-id=327 bgcolor=#fefefe
| 239327 ||  || — || September 9, 2007 || Mount Lemmon || Mount Lemmon Survey || NYS || align=right data-sort-value="0.98" | 980 m || 
|-id=328 bgcolor=#fefefe
| 239328 ||  || — || September 9, 2007 || Mount Lemmon || Mount Lemmon Survey || — || align=right | 1.6 km || 
|-id=329 bgcolor=#d6d6d6
| 239329 ||  || — || September 9, 2007 || Kitt Peak || Spacewatch || — || align=right | 3.5 km || 
|-id=330 bgcolor=#E9E9E9
| 239330 ||  || — || September 10, 2007 || Kitt Peak || Spacewatch || DOR || align=right | 4.5 km || 
|-id=331 bgcolor=#E9E9E9
| 239331 ||  || — || September 10, 2007 || Kitt Peak || Spacewatch || — || align=right | 2.0 km || 
|-id=332 bgcolor=#E9E9E9
| 239332 ||  || — || September 10, 2007 || Mount Lemmon || Mount Lemmon Survey || — || align=right | 3.0 km || 
|-id=333 bgcolor=#d6d6d6
| 239333 ||  || — || September 10, 2007 || Mount Lemmon || Mount Lemmon Survey || — || align=right | 3.1 km || 
|-id=334 bgcolor=#E9E9E9
| 239334 ||  || — || September 10, 2007 || Mount Lemmon || Mount Lemmon Survey || EUN || align=right | 1.3 km || 
|-id=335 bgcolor=#fefefe
| 239335 ||  || — || September 10, 2007 || Mount Lemmon || Mount Lemmon Survey || — || align=right data-sort-value="0.87" | 870 m || 
|-id=336 bgcolor=#d6d6d6
| 239336 ||  || — || September 10, 2007 || Kitt Peak || Spacewatch || — || align=right | 4.6 km || 
|-id=337 bgcolor=#d6d6d6
| 239337 ||  || — || September 10, 2007 || Kitt Peak || Spacewatch || HYG || align=right | 4.0 km || 
|-id=338 bgcolor=#d6d6d6
| 239338 ||  || — || September 11, 2007 || Mount Lemmon || Mount Lemmon Survey || CHA || align=right | 2.3 km || 
|-id=339 bgcolor=#d6d6d6
| 239339 ||  || — || September 11, 2007 || Catalina || CSS || HYG || align=right | 3.2 km || 
|-id=340 bgcolor=#E9E9E9
| 239340 ||  || — || September 11, 2007 || Mount Lemmon || Mount Lemmon Survey || — || align=right | 1.8 km || 
|-id=341 bgcolor=#d6d6d6
| 239341 ||  || — || September 11, 2007 || Mount Lemmon || Mount Lemmon Survey || 3:2 || align=right | 5.1 km || 
|-id=342 bgcolor=#d6d6d6
| 239342 ||  || — || September 11, 2007 || Kitt Peak || Spacewatch || KOR || align=right | 1.4 km || 
|-id=343 bgcolor=#E9E9E9
| 239343 ||  || — || September 11, 2007 || Kitt Peak || Spacewatch || WIT || align=right | 1.5 km || 
|-id=344 bgcolor=#E9E9E9
| 239344 ||  || — || September 11, 2007 || Kitt Peak || Spacewatch || WIT || align=right | 1.5 km || 
|-id=345 bgcolor=#d6d6d6
| 239345 ||  || — || September 12, 2007 || Mount Lemmon || Mount Lemmon Survey || KOR || align=right | 1.7 km || 
|-id=346 bgcolor=#fefefe
| 239346 ||  || — || September 13, 2007 || Socorro || LINEAR || NYS || align=right data-sort-value="0.89" | 890 m || 
|-id=347 bgcolor=#fefefe
| 239347 ||  || — || September 14, 2007 || Socorro || LINEAR || — || align=right data-sort-value="0.90" | 900 m || 
|-id=348 bgcolor=#fefefe
| 239348 ||  || — || September 11, 2007 || Purple Mountain || PMO NEO || NYS || align=right | 1.1 km || 
|-id=349 bgcolor=#d6d6d6
| 239349 ||  || — || September 12, 2007 || Catalina || CSS || — || align=right | 4.7 km || 
|-id=350 bgcolor=#fefefe
| 239350 ||  || — || September 11, 2007 || Purple Mountain || PMO NEO || — || align=right | 1.4 km || 
|-id=351 bgcolor=#E9E9E9
| 239351 ||  || — || September 13, 2007 || Anderson Mesa || LONEOS || — || align=right | 3.1 km || 
|-id=352 bgcolor=#E9E9E9
| 239352 ||  || — || September 10, 2007 || Kitt Peak || Spacewatch || — || align=right | 2.1 km || 
|-id=353 bgcolor=#E9E9E9
| 239353 ||  || — || September 10, 2007 || Kitt Peak || Spacewatch || — || align=right | 3.1 km || 
|-id=354 bgcolor=#E9E9E9
| 239354 ||  || — || September 10, 2007 || Kitt Peak || Spacewatch || — || align=right | 1.4 km || 
|-id=355 bgcolor=#E9E9E9
| 239355 ||  || — || September 10, 2007 || Kitt Peak || Spacewatch || — || align=right | 2.6 km || 
|-id=356 bgcolor=#d6d6d6
| 239356 ||  || — || September 10, 2007 || Mount Lemmon || Mount Lemmon Survey || — || align=right | 4.8 km || 
|-id=357 bgcolor=#d6d6d6
| 239357 ||  || — || September 10, 2007 || Mount Lemmon || Mount Lemmon Survey || — || align=right | 5.0 km || 
|-id=358 bgcolor=#d6d6d6
| 239358 ||  || — || September 10, 2007 || Mount Lemmon || Mount Lemmon Survey || — || align=right | 3.1 km || 
|-id=359 bgcolor=#d6d6d6
| 239359 ||  || — || September 11, 2007 || Mount Lemmon || Mount Lemmon Survey || — || align=right | 3.8 km || 
|-id=360 bgcolor=#d6d6d6
| 239360 ||  || — || September 13, 2007 || Mount Lemmon || Mount Lemmon Survey || EUP || align=right | 5.2 km || 
|-id=361 bgcolor=#d6d6d6
| 239361 ||  || — || September 9, 2007 || Kitt Peak || Spacewatch || — || align=right | 7.2 km || 
|-id=362 bgcolor=#d6d6d6
| 239362 ||  || — || September 12, 2007 || Kitt Peak || Spacewatch || MEL || align=right | 3.2 km || 
|-id=363 bgcolor=#E9E9E9
| 239363 ||  || — || September 12, 2007 || Kitt Peak || Spacewatch || — || align=right | 1.1 km || 
|-id=364 bgcolor=#E9E9E9
| 239364 ||  || — || September 14, 2007 || Mount Lemmon || Mount Lemmon Survey || — || align=right | 1.2 km || 
|-id=365 bgcolor=#d6d6d6
| 239365 ||  || — || September 14, 2007 || Mount Lemmon || Mount Lemmon Survey || EOS || align=right | 2.8 km || 
|-id=366 bgcolor=#d6d6d6
| 239366 ||  || — || September 14, 2007 || Mount Lemmon || Mount Lemmon Survey || — || align=right | 4.5 km || 
|-id=367 bgcolor=#fefefe
| 239367 ||  || — || September 11, 2007 || Kitt Peak || Spacewatch || V || align=right data-sort-value="0.89" | 890 m || 
|-id=368 bgcolor=#E9E9E9
| 239368 ||  || — || September 11, 2007 || Kitt Peak || Spacewatch || — || align=right | 3.7 km || 
|-id=369 bgcolor=#E9E9E9
| 239369 ||  || — || September 11, 2007 || Kitt Peak || Spacewatch || HOF || align=right | 3.6 km || 
|-id=370 bgcolor=#d6d6d6
| 239370 ||  || — || September 14, 2007 || Mount Lemmon || Mount Lemmon Survey || EOS || align=right | 2.7 km || 
|-id=371 bgcolor=#E9E9E9
| 239371 ||  || — || September 6, 2007 || Siding Spring || SSS || EUN || align=right | 1.8 km || 
|-id=372 bgcolor=#E9E9E9
| 239372 ||  || — || September 9, 2007 || Mount Lemmon || Mount Lemmon Survey || — || align=right | 1.2 km || 
|-id=373 bgcolor=#d6d6d6
| 239373 ||  || — || September 13, 2007 || Mount Lemmon || Mount Lemmon Survey || — || align=right | 2.7 km || 
|-id=374 bgcolor=#E9E9E9
| 239374 ||  || — || September 14, 2007 || Mount Lemmon || Mount Lemmon Survey || — || align=right | 3.2 km || 
|-id=375 bgcolor=#E9E9E9
| 239375 ||  || — || September 15, 2007 || Kitt Peak || Spacewatch || — || align=right | 1.3 km || 
|-id=376 bgcolor=#d6d6d6
| 239376 ||  || — || September 14, 2007 || Mount Lemmon || Mount Lemmon Survey || — || align=right | 4.0 km || 
|-id=377 bgcolor=#d6d6d6
| 239377 ||  || — || September 3, 2007 || Catalina || CSS || HYG || align=right | 4.0 km || 
|-id=378 bgcolor=#fefefe
| 239378 ||  || — || September 4, 2007 || Catalina || CSS || MAS || align=right data-sort-value="0.98" | 980 m || 
|-id=379 bgcolor=#E9E9E9
| 239379 ||  || — || September 12, 2007 || Mount Lemmon || Mount Lemmon Survey || — || align=right | 2.3 km || 
|-id=380 bgcolor=#fefefe
| 239380 || 2007 SQ || — || September 18, 2007 || Mayhill || A. Lowe || — || align=right | 3.3 km || 
|-id=381 bgcolor=#E9E9E9
| 239381 ||  || — || September 18, 2007 || Goodricke-Pigott || R. A. Tucker || — || align=right | 2.2 km || 
|-id=382 bgcolor=#d6d6d6
| 239382 ||  || — || September 22, 2007 || Altschwendt || W. Ries || — || align=right | 4.4 km || 
|-id=383 bgcolor=#E9E9E9
| 239383 ||  || — || September 22, 2007 || Črni Vrh || Črni Vrh || — || align=right | 4.2 km || 
|-id=384 bgcolor=#fefefe
| 239384 ||  || — || September 22, 2007 || Črni Vrh || Črni Vrh || KLI || align=right | 2.9 km || 
|-id=385 bgcolor=#d6d6d6
| 239385 ||  || — || September 19, 2007 || Kitt Peak || Spacewatch || EOS || align=right | 2.5 km || 
|-id=386 bgcolor=#d6d6d6
| 239386 ||  || — || September 20, 2007 || Catalina || CSS || BRA || align=right | 2.2 km || 
|-id=387 bgcolor=#E9E9E9
| 239387 ||  || — || September 20, 2007 || Catalina || CSS || GEF || align=right | 1.6 km || 
|-id=388 bgcolor=#d6d6d6
| 239388 ||  || — || September 25, 2007 || Mount Lemmon || Mount Lemmon Survey || — || align=right | 4.2 km || 
|-id=389 bgcolor=#E9E9E9
| 239389 ||  || — || October 6, 2007 || Socorro || LINEAR || — || align=right | 2.2 km || 
|-id=390 bgcolor=#FA8072
| 239390 ||  || — || October 8, 2007 || Catalina || CSS || — || align=right | 1.5 km || 
|-id=391 bgcolor=#d6d6d6
| 239391 ||  || — || October 4, 2007 || Kitt Peak || Spacewatch || EOS || align=right | 2.7 km || 
|-id=392 bgcolor=#E9E9E9
| 239392 ||  || — || October 7, 2007 || Socorro || LINEAR || — || align=right | 3.2 km || 
|-id=393 bgcolor=#d6d6d6
| 239393 ||  || — || October 8, 2007 || Anderson Mesa || LONEOS || — || align=right | 4.3 km || 
|-id=394 bgcolor=#E9E9E9
| 239394 ||  || — || October 8, 2007 || Goodricke-Pigott || R. A. Tucker || — || align=right | 4.5 km || 
|-id=395 bgcolor=#E9E9E9
| 239395 ||  || — || October 9, 2007 || Dauban || Chante-Perdrix Obs. || — || align=right | 1.4 km || 
|-id=396 bgcolor=#d6d6d6
| 239396 ||  || — || October 4, 2007 || Kitt Peak || Spacewatch || — || align=right | 2.9 km || 
|-id=397 bgcolor=#d6d6d6
| 239397 ||  || — || October 4, 2007 || Kitt Peak || Spacewatch || VER || align=right | 3.4 km || 
|-id=398 bgcolor=#E9E9E9
| 239398 ||  || — || October 4, 2007 || Kitt Peak || Spacewatch || HEN || align=right | 1.3 km || 
|-id=399 bgcolor=#d6d6d6
| 239399 ||  || — || October 4, 2007 || Catalina || CSS || EOS || align=right | 2.4 km || 
|-id=400 bgcolor=#E9E9E9
| 239400 ||  || — || October 6, 2007 || Kitt Peak || Spacewatch || — || align=right | 1.00 km || 
|}

239401–239500 

|-bgcolor=#d6d6d6
| 239401 ||  || — || October 6, 2007 || Kitt Peak || Spacewatch || — || align=right | 3.1 km || 
|-id=402 bgcolor=#E9E9E9
| 239402 ||  || — || October 6, 2007 || Purple Mountain || PMO NEO || — || align=right | 1.8 km || 
|-id=403 bgcolor=#E9E9E9
| 239403 ||  || — || October 7, 2007 || Mount Lemmon || Mount Lemmon Survey || MRX || align=right | 1.3 km || 
|-id=404 bgcolor=#d6d6d6
| 239404 ||  || — || October 7, 2007 || Catalina || CSS || — || align=right | 3.6 km || 
|-id=405 bgcolor=#d6d6d6
| 239405 ||  || — || October 4, 2007 || Kitt Peak || Spacewatch || — || align=right | 3.9 km || 
|-id=406 bgcolor=#d6d6d6
| 239406 ||  || — || October 4, 2007 || Kitt Peak || Spacewatch || — || align=right | 3.2 km || 
|-id=407 bgcolor=#E9E9E9
| 239407 ||  || — || October 4, 2007 || Kitt Peak || Spacewatch || — || align=right | 1.4 km || 
|-id=408 bgcolor=#d6d6d6
| 239408 ||  || — || October 4, 2007 || Kitt Peak || Spacewatch || EOS || align=right | 2.8 km || 
|-id=409 bgcolor=#d6d6d6
| 239409 ||  || — || October 4, 2007 || Kitt Peak || Spacewatch || — || align=right | 4.3 km || 
|-id=410 bgcolor=#d6d6d6
| 239410 ||  || — || October 4, 2007 || Kitt Peak || Spacewatch || — || align=right | 4.8 km || 
|-id=411 bgcolor=#E9E9E9
| 239411 ||  || — || October 5, 2007 || Kitt Peak || Spacewatch || — || align=right | 2.0 km || 
|-id=412 bgcolor=#d6d6d6
| 239412 ||  || — || October 7, 2007 || Mount Lemmon || Mount Lemmon Survey || — || align=right | 5.7 km || 
|-id=413 bgcolor=#d6d6d6
| 239413 ||  || — || October 10, 2007 || Catalina || CSS || — || align=right | 7.2 km || 
|-id=414 bgcolor=#E9E9E9
| 239414 ||  || — || October 9, 2007 || Anderson Mesa || LONEOS || MAR || align=right | 1.9 km || 
|-id=415 bgcolor=#E9E9E9
| 239415 ||  || — || October 11, 2007 || Goodricke-Pigott || R. A. Tucker || — || align=right | 1.4 km || 
|-id=416 bgcolor=#E9E9E9
| 239416 ||  || — || October 4, 2007 || Catalina || CSS || — || align=right | 1.8 km || 
|-id=417 bgcolor=#E9E9E9
| 239417 ||  || — || October 5, 2007 || Purple Mountain || PMO NEO || — || align=right | 4.1 km || 
|-id=418 bgcolor=#d6d6d6
| 239418 ||  || — || October 6, 2007 || Kitt Peak || Spacewatch || KOR || align=right | 1.7 km || 
|-id=419 bgcolor=#E9E9E9
| 239419 ||  || — || October 7, 2007 || Catalina || CSS || — || align=right | 1.4 km || 
|-id=420 bgcolor=#E9E9E9
| 239420 ||  || — || October 4, 2007 || Kitt Peak || Spacewatch || — || align=right | 3.6 km || 
|-id=421 bgcolor=#d6d6d6
| 239421 ||  || — || October 8, 2007 || Catalina || CSS || TEL || align=right | 2.3 km || 
|-id=422 bgcolor=#E9E9E9
| 239422 ||  || — || October 6, 2007 || Kitt Peak || Spacewatch || — || align=right | 1.8 km || 
|-id=423 bgcolor=#d6d6d6
| 239423 ||  || — || October 6, 2007 || Kitt Peak || Spacewatch || KOR || align=right | 1.6 km || 
|-id=424 bgcolor=#E9E9E9
| 239424 ||  || — || October 8, 2007 || Mount Lemmon || Mount Lemmon Survey || — || align=right | 1.2 km || 
|-id=425 bgcolor=#E9E9E9
| 239425 ||  || — || October 9, 2007 || Mount Lemmon || Mount Lemmon Survey || — || align=right | 4.2 km || 
|-id=426 bgcolor=#d6d6d6
| 239426 ||  || — || October 9, 2007 || Mount Lemmon || Mount Lemmon Survey || — || align=right | 3.7 km || 
|-id=427 bgcolor=#d6d6d6
| 239427 ||  || — || October 6, 2007 || Socorro || LINEAR || EOS || align=right | 3.0 km || 
|-id=428 bgcolor=#E9E9E9
| 239428 ||  || — || October 7, 2007 || Socorro || LINEAR || MIS || align=right | 3.1 km || 
|-id=429 bgcolor=#d6d6d6
| 239429 ||  || — || October 7, 2007 || Socorro || LINEAR || — || align=right | 4.7 km || 
|-id=430 bgcolor=#d6d6d6
| 239430 ||  || — || October 9, 2007 || Socorro || LINEAR || — || align=right | 4.0 km || 
|-id=431 bgcolor=#d6d6d6
| 239431 ||  || — || October 9, 2007 || Socorro || LINEAR || — || align=right | 3.4 km || 
|-id=432 bgcolor=#d6d6d6
| 239432 ||  || — || October 9, 2007 || Socorro || LINEAR || ALA || align=right | 5.7 km || 
|-id=433 bgcolor=#E9E9E9
| 239433 ||  || — || October 11, 2007 || Socorro || LINEAR || — || align=right | 3.1 km || 
|-id=434 bgcolor=#d6d6d6
| 239434 ||  || — || October 11, 2007 || Socorro || LINEAR || — || align=right | 5.0 km || 
|-id=435 bgcolor=#d6d6d6
| 239435 ||  || — || October 11, 2007 || Socorro || LINEAR || HYG || align=right | 3.6 km || 
|-id=436 bgcolor=#E9E9E9
| 239436 ||  || — || October 11, 2007 || Socorro || LINEAR || — || align=right | 4.1 km || 
|-id=437 bgcolor=#d6d6d6
| 239437 ||  || — || October 11, 2007 || Socorro || LINEAR || — || align=right | 3.8 km || 
|-id=438 bgcolor=#d6d6d6
| 239438 ||  || — || October 11, 2007 || Socorro || LINEAR || — || align=right | 5.3 km || 
|-id=439 bgcolor=#d6d6d6
| 239439 ||  || — || October 12, 2007 || Socorro || LINEAR || — || align=right | 3.2 km || 
|-id=440 bgcolor=#d6d6d6
| 239440 ||  || — || October 13, 2007 || Socorro || LINEAR || — || align=right | 3.7 km || 
|-id=441 bgcolor=#d6d6d6
| 239441 ||  || — || October 4, 2007 || Kitt Peak || Spacewatch || K-2 || align=right | 1.7 km || 
|-id=442 bgcolor=#d6d6d6
| 239442 ||  || — || October 6, 2007 || Kitt Peak || Spacewatch || EOS || align=right | 2.8 km || 
|-id=443 bgcolor=#d6d6d6
| 239443 ||  || — || October 6, 2007 || Kitt Peak || Spacewatch || — || align=right | 4.9 km || 
|-id=444 bgcolor=#d6d6d6
| 239444 ||  || — || October 7, 2007 || Mount Lemmon || Mount Lemmon Survey || — || align=right | 3.0 km || 
|-id=445 bgcolor=#d6d6d6
| 239445 ||  || — || October 8, 2007 || Mount Lemmon || Mount Lemmon Survey || — || align=right | 3.9 km || 
|-id=446 bgcolor=#E9E9E9
| 239446 ||  || — || October 13, 2007 || Socorro || LINEAR || — || align=right | 2.3 km || 
|-id=447 bgcolor=#E9E9E9
| 239447 ||  || — || October 13, 2007 || Socorro || LINEAR || — || align=right | 3.9 km || 
|-id=448 bgcolor=#d6d6d6
| 239448 ||  || — || October 4, 2007 || Mount Lemmon || Mount Lemmon Survey || — || align=right | 2.9 km || 
|-id=449 bgcolor=#d6d6d6
| 239449 ||  || — || October 10, 2007 || Catalina || CSS || — || align=right | 4.4 km || 
|-id=450 bgcolor=#E9E9E9
| 239450 ||  || — || October 7, 2007 || Kitt Peak || Spacewatch || MRX || align=right | 1.5 km || 
|-id=451 bgcolor=#d6d6d6
| 239451 ||  || — || October 7, 2007 || Kitt Peak || Spacewatch || CHA || align=right | 2.4 km || 
|-id=452 bgcolor=#E9E9E9
| 239452 ||  || — || October 8, 2007 || Kitt Peak || Spacewatch || — || align=right | 1.1 km || 
|-id=453 bgcolor=#d6d6d6
| 239453 ||  || — || October 8, 2007 || Kitt Peak || Spacewatch || — || align=right | 2.5 km || 
|-id=454 bgcolor=#d6d6d6
| 239454 ||  || — || October 9, 2007 || Kitt Peak || Spacewatch || KAR || align=right | 1.4 km || 
|-id=455 bgcolor=#d6d6d6
| 239455 ||  || — || October 9, 2007 || Mount Lemmon || Mount Lemmon Survey || EOS || align=right | 2.6 km || 
|-id=456 bgcolor=#fefefe
| 239456 ||  || — || October 8, 2007 || Catalina || CSS || — || align=right | 3.3 km || 
|-id=457 bgcolor=#d6d6d6
| 239457 ||  || — || October 10, 2007 || Kitt Peak || Spacewatch || — || align=right | 4.1 km || 
|-id=458 bgcolor=#d6d6d6
| 239458 ||  || — || October 9, 2007 || Kitt Peak || Spacewatch || — || align=right | 4.1 km || 
|-id=459 bgcolor=#d6d6d6
| 239459 ||  || — || October 11, 2007 || Mount Lemmon || Mount Lemmon Survey || — || align=right | 3.1 km || 
|-id=460 bgcolor=#d6d6d6
| 239460 ||  || — || October 7, 2007 || Mount Lemmon || Mount Lemmon Survey || — || align=right | 3.1 km || 
|-id=461 bgcolor=#d6d6d6
| 239461 ||  || — || October 7, 2007 || Mount Lemmon || Mount Lemmon Survey || — || align=right | 2.9 km || 
|-id=462 bgcolor=#E9E9E9
| 239462 ||  || — || October 11, 2007 || Lulin || LUSS || — || align=right | 3.7 km || 
|-id=463 bgcolor=#E9E9E9
| 239463 ||  || — || October 12, 2007 || Kitt Peak || Spacewatch || GEF || align=right | 2.6 km || 
|-id=464 bgcolor=#E9E9E9
| 239464 ||  || — || October 14, 2007 || Mount Lemmon || Mount Lemmon Survey || AGN || align=right | 1.5 km || 
|-id=465 bgcolor=#d6d6d6
| 239465 ||  || — || October 14, 2007 || Catalina || CSS || — || align=right | 4.5 km || 
|-id=466 bgcolor=#E9E9E9
| 239466 ||  || — || October 15, 2007 || Mount Lemmon || Mount Lemmon Survey || — || align=right | 3.4 km || 
|-id=467 bgcolor=#fefefe
| 239467 ||  || — || October 15, 2007 || Catalina || CSS || NYS || align=right data-sort-value="0.93" | 930 m || 
|-id=468 bgcolor=#d6d6d6
| 239468 ||  || — || October 13, 2007 || Catalina || CSS || KOR || align=right | 2.2 km || 
|-id=469 bgcolor=#d6d6d6
| 239469 ||  || — || October 10, 2007 || Mount Lemmon || Mount Lemmon Survey || — || align=right | 3.8 km || 
|-id=470 bgcolor=#d6d6d6
| 239470 ||  || — || October 10, 2007 || Lulin || LUSS || — || align=right | 4.8 km || 
|-id=471 bgcolor=#d6d6d6
| 239471 ||  || — || October 16, 2007 || Catalina || CSS || — || align=right | 3.7 km || 
|-id=472 bgcolor=#fefefe
| 239472 ||  || — || October 18, 2007 || Mount Lemmon || Mount Lemmon Survey || — || align=right | 1.3 km || 
|-id=473 bgcolor=#d6d6d6
| 239473 ||  || — || October 17, 2007 || Catalina || CSS || URS || align=right | 6.1 km || 
|-id=474 bgcolor=#d6d6d6
| 239474 ||  || — || October 18, 2007 || Mount Lemmon || Mount Lemmon Survey || KOR || align=right | 1.8 km || 
|-id=475 bgcolor=#E9E9E9
| 239475 ||  || — || October 16, 2007 || Kitt Peak || Spacewatch || — || align=right | 2.9 km || 
|-id=476 bgcolor=#d6d6d6
| 239476 ||  || — || October 16, 2007 || Kitt Peak || Spacewatch || — || align=right | 3.2 km || 
|-id=477 bgcolor=#d6d6d6
| 239477 ||  || — || October 16, 2007 || Kitt Peak || Spacewatch || — || align=right | 3.9 km || 
|-id=478 bgcolor=#E9E9E9
| 239478 ||  || — || October 18, 2007 || Mount Lemmon || Mount Lemmon Survey || HEN || align=right | 1.5 km || 
|-id=479 bgcolor=#E9E9E9
| 239479 ||  || — || October 19, 2007 || Catalina || CSS || — || align=right | 1.3 km || 
|-id=480 bgcolor=#E9E9E9
| 239480 ||  || — || October 19, 2007 || Catalina || CSS || WIT || align=right | 1.4 km || 
|-id=481 bgcolor=#E9E9E9
| 239481 ||  || — || October 16, 2007 || Kitt Peak || Spacewatch || HNA || align=right | 2.4 km || 
|-id=482 bgcolor=#d6d6d6
| 239482 ||  || — || October 30, 2007 || Mount Lemmon || Mount Lemmon Survey || — || align=right | 3.3 km || 
|-id=483 bgcolor=#d6d6d6
| 239483 ||  || — || October 31, 2007 || Mount Lemmon || Mount Lemmon Survey || KOR || align=right | 1.4 km || 
|-id=484 bgcolor=#d6d6d6
| 239484 ||  || — || October 30, 2007 || Kitt Peak || Spacewatch || 637 || align=right | 3.8 km || 
|-id=485 bgcolor=#d6d6d6
| 239485 ||  || — || October 30, 2007 || Kitt Peak || Spacewatch || KOR || align=right | 1.8 km || 
|-id=486 bgcolor=#d6d6d6
| 239486 ||  || — || October 30, 2007 || Mount Lemmon || Mount Lemmon Survey || KOR || align=right | 1.5 km || 
|-id=487 bgcolor=#E9E9E9
| 239487 ||  || — || October 30, 2007 || Kitt Peak || Spacewatch || — || align=right | 5.3 km || 
|-id=488 bgcolor=#d6d6d6
| 239488 ||  || — || October 31, 2007 || Catalina || CSS || — || align=right | 4.5 km || 
|-id=489 bgcolor=#E9E9E9
| 239489 ||  || — || October 30, 2007 || Kitt Peak || Spacewatch || RAF || align=right | 1.7 km || 
|-id=490 bgcolor=#d6d6d6
| 239490 ||  || — || October 31, 2007 || Kitt Peak || Spacewatch || — || align=right | 3.0 km || 
|-id=491 bgcolor=#d6d6d6
| 239491 ||  || — || October 19, 2007 || Catalina || CSS || — || align=right | 4.2 km || 
|-id=492 bgcolor=#d6d6d6
| 239492 ||  || — || October 31, 2007 || Kitt Peak || Spacewatch || — || align=right | 3.7 km || 
|-id=493 bgcolor=#d6d6d6
| 239493 ||  || — || November 3, 2007 || 7300 Observatory || W. K. Y. Yeung || URS || align=right | 5.6 km || 
|-id=494 bgcolor=#d6d6d6
| 239494 ||  || — || November 1, 2007 || Kitt Peak || Spacewatch || — || align=right | 4.7 km || 
|-id=495 bgcolor=#d6d6d6
| 239495 ||  || — || November 1, 2007 || Kitt Peak || Spacewatch || — || align=right | 4.0 km || 
|-id=496 bgcolor=#d6d6d6
| 239496 ||  || — || November 1, 2007 || Kitt Peak || Spacewatch || — || align=right | 4.1 km || 
|-id=497 bgcolor=#E9E9E9
| 239497 ||  || — || November 2, 2007 || Kitt Peak || Spacewatch || — || align=right | 2.3 km || 
|-id=498 bgcolor=#d6d6d6
| 239498 ||  || — || November 2, 2007 || Catalina || CSS || — || align=right | 6.3 km || 
|-id=499 bgcolor=#E9E9E9
| 239499 ||  || — || November 1, 2007 || Kitt Peak || Spacewatch || — || align=right | 2.4 km || 
|-id=500 bgcolor=#d6d6d6
| 239500 ||  || — || November 5, 2007 || Kitt Peak || Spacewatch || — || align=right | 5.3 km || 
|}

239501–239600 

|-bgcolor=#d6d6d6
| 239501 ||  || — || November 1, 2007 || Mount Lemmon || Mount Lemmon Survey || — || align=right | 3.2 km || 
|-id=502 bgcolor=#d6d6d6
| 239502 ||  || — || November 5, 2007 || Kitt Peak || Spacewatch || — || align=right | 5.5 km || 
|-id=503 bgcolor=#d6d6d6
| 239503 ||  || — || November 5, 2007 || Kitt Peak || Spacewatch || SYL7:4 || align=right | 5.8 km || 
|-id=504 bgcolor=#d6d6d6
| 239504 ||  || — || November 7, 2007 || Kitt Peak || Spacewatch || — || align=right | 3.3 km || 
|-id=505 bgcolor=#d6d6d6
| 239505 ||  || — || November 12, 2007 || Magdalena Ridge || W. H. Ryan || EOS || align=right | 3.4 km || 
|-id=506 bgcolor=#E9E9E9
| 239506 ||  || — || November 9, 2007 || Kitt Peak || Spacewatch || — || align=right | 2.4 km || 
|-id=507 bgcolor=#d6d6d6
| 239507 ||  || — || November 9, 2007 || Kitt Peak || Spacewatch || — || align=right | 4.5 km || 
|-id=508 bgcolor=#E9E9E9
| 239508 ||  || — || November 9, 2007 || Kitt Peak || Spacewatch || — || align=right | 2.1 km || 
|-id=509 bgcolor=#d6d6d6
| 239509 ||  || — || November 7, 2007 || Kitt Peak || Spacewatch || EOS || align=right | 3.3 km || 
|-id=510 bgcolor=#E9E9E9
| 239510 ||  || — || November 7, 2007 || Kitt Peak || Spacewatch || HNA || align=right | 3.3 km || 
|-id=511 bgcolor=#d6d6d6
| 239511 ||  || — || November 14, 2007 || Socorro || LINEAR || — || align=right | 4.5 km || 
|-id=512 bgcolor=#d6d6d6
| 239512 ||  || — || November 13, 2007 || Kitt Peak || Spacewatch || HYG || align=right | 3.0 km || 
|-id=513 bgcolor=#d6d6d6
| 239513 ||  || — || November 15, 2007 || Anderson Mesa || LONEOS || — || align=right | 4.4 km || 
|-id=514 bgcolor=#d6d6d6
| 239514 ||  || — || November 11, 2007 || Catalina || CSS || — || align=right | 6.0 km || 
|-id=515 bgcolor=#d6d6d6
| 239515 ||  || — || November 18, 2007 || Mount Lemmon || Mount Lemmon Survey || — || align=right | 3.8 km || 
|-id=516 bgcolor=#E9E9E9
| 239516 ||  || — || November 17, 2007 || Kitt Peak || Spacewatch || DOR || align=right | 4.8 km || 
|-id=517 bgcolor=#d6d6d6
| 239517 ||  || — || December 13, 2007 || Dauban || Chante-Perdrix Obs. || — || align=right | 3.3 km || 
|-id=518 bgcolor=#d6d6d6
| 239518 ||  || — || January 10, 2008 || Kitt Peak || Spacewatch || BRA || align=right | 3.5 km || 
|-id=519 bgcolor=#d6d6d6
| 239519 ||  || — || February 27, 2008 || Catalina || CSS || — || align=right | 6.5 km || 
|-id=520 bgcolor=#fefefe
| 239520 ||  || — || April 6, 2008 || Mount Lemmon || Mount Lemmon Survey || — || align=right data-sort-value="0.78" | 780 m || 
|-id=521 bgcolor=#C2FFFF
| 239521 ||  || — || April 26, 2008 || Dauban || F. Kugel || L5 || align=right | 15 km || 
|-id=522 bgcolor=#E9E9E9
| 239522 ||  || — || July 30, 2008 || Mount Lemmon || Mount Lemmon Survey || — || align=right | 2.5 km || 
|-id=523 bgcolor=#fefefe
| 239523 ||  || — || August 1, 2008 || Socorro || LINEAR || H || align=right data-sort-value="0.99" | 990 m || 
|-id=524 bgcolor=#d6d6d6
| 239524 ||  || — || August 30, 2008 || Socorro || LINEAR || — || align=right | 3.2 km || 
|-id=525 bgcolor=#d6d6d6
| 239525 ||  || — || September 3, 2008 || Kitt Peak || Spacewatch || — || align=right | 4.9 km || 
|-id=526 bgcolor=#fefefe
| 239526 ||  || — || September 3, 2008 || La Sagra || OAM Obs. || V || align=right data-sort-value="0.91" | 910 m || 
|-id=527 bgcolor=#fefefe
| 239527 ||  || — || September 2, 2008 || Kitt Peak || Spacewatch || NYS || align=right data-sort-value="0.66" | 660 m || 
|-id=528 bgcolor=#fefefe
| 239528 ||  || — || September 2, 2008 || Kitt Peak || Spacewatch || MAS || align=right data-sort-value="0.85" | 850 m || 
|-id=529 bgcolor=#E9E9E9
| 239529 ||  || — || September 3, 2008 || Kitt Peak || Spacewatch || — || align=right | 1.3 km || 
|-id=530 bgcolor=#fefefe
| 239530 ||  || — || September 6, 2008 || Kitt Peak || Spacewatch || — || align=right | 1.2 km || 
|-id=531 bgcolor=#d6d6d6
| 239531 ||  || — || September 7, 2008 || Mount Lemmon || Mount Lemmon Survey || 3:2 || align=right | 4.4 km || 
|-id=532 bgcolor=#fefefe
| 239532 ||  || — || September 7, 2008 || Mount Lemmon || Mount Lemmon Survey || — || align=right data-sort-value="0.86" | 860 m || 
|-id=533 bgcolor=#fefefe
| 239533 ||  || — || September 22, 2008 || Socorro || LINEAR || FLO || align=right data-sort-value="0.87" | 870 m || 
|-id=534 bgcolor=#fefefe
| 239534 ||  || — || September 21, 2008 || Kitt Peak || Spacewatch || — || align=right | 1.1 km || 
|-id=535 bgcolor=#fefefe
| 239535 ||  || — || September 19, 2008 || Kitt Peak || Spacewatch || NYS || align=right data-sort-value="0.64" | 640 m || 
|-id=536 bgcolor=#fefefe
| 239536 ||  || — || September 19, 2008 || Kitt Peak || Spacewatch || — || align=right | 1.0 km || 
|-id=537 bgcolor=#fefefe
| 239537 ||  || — || September 20, 2008 || Kitt Peak || Spacewatch || FLO || align=right data-sort-value="0.97" | 970 m || 
|-id=538 bgcolor=#E9E9E9
| 239538 ||  || — || September 20, 2008 || Kitt Peak || Spacewatch || WIT || align=right | 1.4 km || 
|-id=539 bgcolor=#fefefe
| 239539 ||  || — || September 20, 2008 || Kitt Peak || Spacewatch || — || align=right data-sort-value="0.87" | 870 m || 
|-id=540 bgcolor=#fefefe
| 239540 ||  || — || September 20, 2008 || Kitt Peak || Spacewatch || V || align=right data-sort-value="0.65" | 650 m || 
|-id=541 bgcolor=#E9E9E9
| 239541 ||  || — || September 25, 2008 || Sierra Stars || F. Tozzi || EUN || align=right | 1.9 km || 
|-id=542 bgcolor=#d6d6d6
| 239542 ||  || — || September 21, 2008 || Kitt Peak || Spacewatch || — || align=right | 5.3 km || 
|-id=543 bgcolor=#d6d6d6
| 239543 ||  || — || September 21, 2008 || Kitt Peak || Spacewatch || HYG || align=right | 4.4 km || 
|-id=544 bgcolor=#E9E9E9
| 239544 ||  || — || September 21, 2008 || Kitt Peak || Spacewatch || — || align=right | 3.5 km || 
|-id=545 bgcolor=#d6d6d6
| 239545 ||  || — || September 21, 2008 || Kitt Peak || Spacewatch || — || align=right | 3.6 km || 
|-id=546 bgcolor=#fefefe
| 239546 ||  || — || September 21, 2008 || Kitt Peak || Spacewatch || — || align=right data-sort-value="0.98" | 980 m || 
|-id=547 bgcolor=#d6d6d6
| 239547 ||  || — || September 21, 2008 || Mount Lemmon || Mount Lemmon Survey || — || align=right | 2.7 km || 
|-id=548 bgcolor=#E9E9E9
| 239548 ||  || — || September 21, 2008 || Mount Lemmon || Mount Lemmon Survey || KON || align=right | 3.1 km || 
|-id=549 bgcolor=#d6d6d6
| 239549 ||  || — || September 21, 2008 || Kitt Peak || Spacewatch || — || align=right | 5.0 km || 
|-id=550 bgcolor=#fefefe
| 239550 ||  || — || September 22, 2008 || Kitt Peak || Spacewatch || FLO || align=right data-sort-value="0.82" | 820 m || 
|-id=551 bgcolor=#fefefe
| 239551 ||  || — || September 22, 2008 || Kitt Peak || Spacewatch || — || align=right | 1.1 km || 
|-id=552 bgcolor=#fefefe
| 239552 ||  || — || September 23, 2008 || Kitt Peak || Spacewatch || — || align=right | 2.9 km || 
|-id=553 bgcolor=#E9E9E9
| 239553 ||  || — || September 23, 2008 || Kitt Peak || Spacewatch || — || align=right | 3.8 km || 
|-id=554 bgcolor=#E9E9E9
| 239554 ||  || — || September 24, 2008 || Mount Lemmon || Mount Lemmon Survey || — || align=right | 1.9 km || 
|-id=555 bgcolor=#E9E9E9
| 239555 ||  || — || September 23, 2008 || Socorro || LINEAR || — || align=right | 1.8 km || 
|-id=556 bgcolor=#fefefe
| 239556 ||  || — || September 28, 2008 || Socorro || LINEAR || CHL || align=right | 2.1 km || 
|-id=557 bgcolor=#fefefe
| 239557 ||  || — || September 22, 2008 || Catalina || CSS || H || align=right data-sort-value="0.96" | 960 m || 
|-id=558 bgcolor=#d6d6d6
| 239558 ||  || — || September 23, 2008 || Mount Lemmon || Mount Lemmon Survey || NAE || align=right | 4.7 km || 
|-id=559 bgcolor=#E9E9E9
| 239559 ||  || — || September 23, 2008 || Mount Lemmon || Mount Lemmon Survey || WIT || align=right | 1.4 km || 
|-id=560 bgcolor=#E9E9E9
| 239560 ||  || — || September 25, 2008 || Kitt Peak || Spacewatch || — || align=right | 2.8 km || 
|-id=561 bgcolor=#fefefe
| 239561 ||  || — || September 25, 2008 || Kitt Peak || Spacewatch || FLO || align=right | 1.6 km || 
|-id=562 bgcolor=#fefefe
| 239562 ||  || — || September 26, 2008 || Kitt Peak || Spacewatch || — || align=right | 1.1 km || 
|-id=563 bgcolor=#fefefe
| 239563 ||  || — || September 29, 2008 || Kitt Peak || Spacewatch || V || align=right data-sort-value="0.67" | 670 m || 
|-id=564 bgcolor=#E9E9E9
| 239564 ||  || — || September 29, 2008 || Catalina || CSS || — || align=right | 2.7 km || 
|-id=565 bgcolor=#fefefe
| 239565 ||  || — || September 29, 2008 || Catalina || CSS || FLO || align=right data-sort-value="0.62" | 620 m || 
|-id=566 bgcolor=#E9E9E9
| 239566 ||  || — || September 22, 2008 || Kitt Peak || Spacewatch || — || align=right | 3.4 km || 
|-id=567 bgcolor=#E9E9E9
| 239567 ||  || — || September 23, 2008 || Kitt Peak || Spacewatch || HOF || align=right | 4.5 km || 
|-id=568 bgcolor=#E9E9E9
| 239568 ||  || — || October 1, 2008 || La Sagra || OAM Obs. || MIS || align=right | 2.6 km || 
|-id=569 bgcolor=#E9E9E9
| 239569 ||  || — || October 1, 2008 || Kitt Peak || Spacewatch || NEM || align=right | 2.2 km || 
|-id=570 bgcolor=#fefefe
| 239570 ||  || — || October 2, 2008 || Kitt Peak || Spacewatch || — || align=right | 1.1 km || 
|-id=571 bgcolor=#fefefe
| 239571 ||  || — || October 2, 2008 || Kitt Peak || Spacewatch || — || align=right data-sort-value="0.72" | 720 m || 
|-id=572 bgcolor=#fefefe
| 239572 ||  || — || October 2, 2008 || Kitt Peak || Spacewatch || NYS || align=right data-sort-value="0.74" | 740 m || 
|-id=573 bgcolor=#E9E9E9
| 239573 ||  || — || October 2, 2008 || Kitt Peak || Spacewatch || — || align=right | 1.2 km || 
|-id=574 bgcolor=#fefefe
| 239574 ||  || — || October 3, 2008 || Kitt Peak || Spacewatch || NYS || align=right data-sort-value="0.79" | 790 m || 
|-id=575 bgcolor=#fefefe
| 239575 ||  || — || October 3, 2008 || Kitt Peak || Spacewatch || — || align=right | 1.7 km || 
|-id=576 bgcolor=#fefefe
| 239576 ||  || — || October 5, 2008 || La Sagra || OAM Obs. || FLO || align=right data-sort-value="0.76" | 760 m || 
|-id=577 bgcolor=#fefefe
| 239577 ||  || — || October 6, 2008 || Kitt Peak || Spacewatch || — || align=right | 1.1 km || 
|-id=578 bgcolor=#fefefe
| 239578 ||  || — || October 6, 2008 || Catalina || CSS || — || align=right | 1.4 km || 
|-id=579 bgcolor=#fefefe
| 239579 ||  || — || October 6, 2008 || Kitt Peak || Spacewatch || V || align=right data-sort-value="0.96" | 960 m || 
|-id=580 bgcolor=#E9E9E9
| 239580 ||  || — || October 9, 2008 || Mount Lemmon || Mount Lemmon Survey || — || align=right | 4.5 km || 
|-id=581 bgcolor=#d6d6d6
| 239581 ||  || — || October 5, 2008 || La Sagra || OAM Obs. || — || align=right | 4.9 km || 
|-id=582 bgcolor=#E9E9E9
| 239582 ||  || — || October 8, 2008 || Mount Lemmon || Mount Lemmon Survey || — || align=right | 3.1 km || 
|-id=583 bgcolor=#fefefe
| 239583 ||  || — || October 9, 2008 || Mount Lemmon || Mount Lemmon Survey || — || align=right | 1.3 km || 
|-id=584 bgcolor=#E9E9E9
| 239584 ||  || — || October 6, 2008 || Mount Lemmon || Mount Lemmon Survey || HEN || align=right | 1.3 km || 
|-id=585 bgcolor=#fefefe
| 239585 ||  || — || October 17, 2008 || Kitt Peak || Spacewatch || MAS || align=right data-sort-value="0.75" | 750 m || 
|-id=586 bgcolor=#fefefe
| 239586 ||  || — || October 17, 2008 || Kitt Peak || Spacewatch || NYS || align=right data-sort-value="0.89" | 890 m || 
|-id=587 bgcolor=#fefefe
| 239587 ||  || — || October 19, 2008 || Kitt Peak || Spacewatch || — || align=right | 1.7 km || 
|-id=588 bgcolor=#fefefe
| 239588 ||  || — || October 20, 2008 || Kitt Peak || Spacewatch || FLO || align=right data-sort-value="0.60" | 600 m || 
|-id=589 bgcolor=#fefefe
| 239589 ||  || — || October 20, 2008 || Kitt Peak || Spacewatch || — || align=right data-sort-value="0.83" | 830 m || 
|-id=590 bgcolor=#fefefe
| 239590 ||  || — || October 20, 2008 || Mount Lemmon || Mount Lemmon Survey || FLO || align=right data-sort-value="0.91" | 910 m || 
|-id=591 bgcolor=#fefefe
| 239591 ||  || — || October 20, 2008 || Kitt Peak || Spacewatch || — || align=right data-sort-value="0.82" | 820 m || 
|-id=592 bgcolor=#fefefe
| 239592 ||  || — || October 20, 2008 || Mount Lemmon || Mount Lemmon Survey || — || align=right | 2.2 km || 
|-id=593 bgcolor=#fefefe
| 239593 Tianwenbang ||  ||  || October 20, 2008 || Lulin Observatory || X. Y. Hsiao, Q.-z. Ye || — || align=right data-sort-value="0.98" | 980 m || 
|-id=594 bgcolor=#fefefe
| 239594 ||  || — || October 21, 2008 || Kitt Peak || Spacewatch || FLO || align=right data-sort-value="0.69" | 690 m || 
|-id=595 bgcolor=#E9E9E9
| 239595 ||  || — || October 21, 2008 || Kitt Peak || Spacewatch || — || align=right | 4.4 km || 
|-id=596 bgcolor=#fefefe
| 239596 ||  || — || October 21, 2008 || Kitt Peak || Spacewatch || — || align=right | 1.2 km || 
|-id=597 bgcolor=#fefefe
| 239597 ||  || — || October 26, 2008 || Socorro || LINEAR || V || align=right | 1.2 km || 
|-id=598 bgcolor=#E9E9E9
| 239598 ||  || — || October 22, 2008 || Kitt Peak || Spacewatch || — || align=right | 2.6 km || 
|-id=599 bgcolor=#E9E9E9
| 239599 ||  || — || October 22, 2008 || Kitt Peak || Spacewatch || — || align=right | 1.8 km || 
|-id=600 bgcolor=#fefefe
| 239600 ||  || — || October 23, 2008 || Kitt Peak || Spacewatch || NYS || align=right data-sort-value="0.77" | 770 m || 
|}

239601–239700 

|-bgcolor=#fefefe
| 239601 ||  || — || October 23, 2008 || Kitt Peak || Spacewatch || — || align=right | 1.0 km || 
|-id=602 bgcolor=#E9E9E9
| 239602 ||  || — || October 23, 2008 || Kitt Peak || Spacewatch || — || align=right | 1.3 km || 
|-id=603 bgcolor=#fefefe
| 239603 ||  || — || October 23, 2008 || Kitt Peak || Spacewatch || V || align=right data-sort-value="0.99" | 990 m || 
|-id=604 bgcolor=#fefefe
| 239604 ||  || — || October 23, 2008 || Kitt Peak || Spacewatch || — || align=right data-sort-value="0.84" | 840 m || 
|-id=605 bgcolor=#E9E9E9
| 239605 ||  || — || October 23, 2008 || Mount Lemmon || Mount Lemmon Survey || — || align=right | 1.4 km || 
|-id=606 bgcolor=#E9E9E9
| 239606 ||  || — || October 24, 2008 || Kitt Peak || Spacewatch || — || align=right | 2.9 km || 
|-id=607 bgcolor=#fefefe
| 239607 ||  || — || October 25, 2008 || Mount Lemmon || Mount Lemmon Survey || CLA || align=right | 1.7 km || 
|-id=608 bgcolor=#E9E9E9
| 239608 ||  || — || October 27, 2008 || Mount Lemmon || Mount Lemmon Survey || — || align=right | 1.6 km || 
|-id=609 bgcolor=#E9E9E9
| 239609 ||  || — || October 27, 2008 || Socorro || LINEAR || — || align=right | 2.2 km || 
|-id=610 bgcolor=#d6d6d6
| 239610 ||  || — || October 23, 2008 || Kitt Peak || Spacewatch || — || align=right | 3.6 km || 
|-id=611 bgcolor=#fefefe
| 239611 Likwohting ||  ||  || October 23, 2008 || Lulin Observatory || X. Y. Hsiao, Q.-z. Ye || — || align=right | 1.2 km || 
|-id=612 bgcolor=#E9E9E9
| 239612 ||  || — || October 24, 2008 || Kitt Peak || Spacewatch || — || align=right | 1.4 km || 
|-id=613 bgcolor=#E9E9E9
| 239613 ||  || — || October 25, 2008 || Mount Lemmon || Mount Lemmon Survey || AGN || align=right | 2.0 km || 
|-id=614 bgcolor=#fefefe
| 239614 ||  || — || October 25, 2008 || Kitt Peak || Spacewatch || — || align=right | 1.3 km || 
|-id=615 bgcolor=#E9E9E9
| 239615 ||  || — || October 26, 2008 || Kitt Peak || Spacewatch || — || align=right | 2.1 km || 
|-id=616 bgcolor=#E9E9E9
| 239616 ||  || — || October 26, 2008 || Kitt Peak || Spacewatch || — || align=right | 3.9 km || 
|-id=617 bgcolor=#E9E9E9
| 239617 ||  || — || October 26, 2008 || Kitt Peak || Spacewatch || — || align=right | 1.4 km || 
|-id=618 bgcolor=#d6d6d6
| 239618 ||  || — || October 27, 2008 || Kitt Peak || Spacewatch || — || align=right | 4.8 km || 
|-id=619 bgcolor=#E9E9E9
| 239619 ||  || — || October 27, 2008 || Kitt Peak || Spacewatch || — || align=right | 1.0 km || 
|-id=620 bgcolor=#E9E9E9
| 239620 ||  || — || October 28, 2008 || Mount Lemmon || Mount Lemmon Survey || — || align=right | 3.3 km || 
|-id=621 bgcolor=#fefefe
| 239621 ||  || — || October 28, 2008 || Kitt Peak || Spacewatch || — || align=right data-sort-value="0.94" | 940 m || 
|-id=622 bgcolor=#E9E9E9
| 239622 ||  || — || October 31, 2008 || Kitt Peak || Spacewatch || — || align=right | 2.5 km || 
|-id=623 bgcolor=#E9E9E9
| 239623 ||  || — || October 21, 2008 || Mount Lemmon || Mount Lemmon Survey || — || align=right | 2.7 km || 
|-id=624 bgcolor=#d6d6d6
| 239624 ||  || — || October 26, 2008 || Catalina || CSS || — || align=right | 3.6 km || 
|-id=625 bgcolor=#E9E9E9
| 239625 ||  || — || October 26, 2008 || Mount Lemmon || Mount Lemmon Survey || — || align=right | 2.4 km || 
|-id=626 bgcolor=#E9E9E9
| 239626 ||  || — || October 28, 2008 || Kitt Peak || Spacewatch || — || align=right | 1.6 km || 
|-id=627 bgcolor=#E9E9E9
| 239627 ||  || — || November 2, 2008 || Socorro || LINEAR || — || align=right | 1.3 km || 
|-id=628 bgcolor=#E9E9E9
| 239628 ||  || — || November 2, 2008 || Mount Lemmon || Mount Lemmon Survey || — || align=right | 1.2 km || 
|-id=629 bgcolor=#fefefe
| 239629 ||  || — || November 2, 2008 || Mount Lemmon || Mount Lemmon Survey || — || align=right | 1.2 km || 
|-id=630 bgcolor=#fefefe
| 239630 ||  || — || November 5, 2008 || Bisei SG Center || BATTeRS || V || align=right data-sort-value="0.95" | 950 m || 
|-id=631 bgcolor=#E9E9E9
| 239631 ||  || — || November 3, 2008 || Mount Lemmon || Mount Lemmon Survey || — || align=right | 1.2 km || 
|-id=632 bgcolor=#E9E9E9
| 239632 ||  || — || November 7, 2008 || Catalina || CSS || — || align=right | 1.1 km || 
|-id=633 bgcolor=#fefefe
| 239633 ||  || — || November 7, 2008 || Mount Lemmon || Mount Lemmon Survey || — || align=right | 2.1 km || 
|-id=634 bgcolor=#E9E9E9
| 239634 ||  || — || November 1, 2008 || Mount Lemmon || Mount Lemmon Survey || — || align=right | 1.3 km || 
|-id=635 bgcolor=#d6d6d6
| 239635 ||  || — || November 19, 2008 || Bisei SG Center || BATTeRS || — || align=right | 3.1 km || 
|-id=636 bgcolor=#d6d6d6
| 239636 ||  || — || November 20, 2008 || Mount Lemmon || Mount Lemmon Survey || — || align=right | 4.7 km || 
|-id=637 bgcolor=#E9E9E9
| 239637 ||  || — || November 18, 2008 || Kitt Peak || Spacewatch || — || align=right | 1.6 km || 
|-id=638 bgcolor=#fefefe
| 239638 ||  || — || November 18, 2008 || Socorro || LINEAR || — || align=right | 1.1 km || 
|-id=639 bgcolor=#fefefe
| 239639 ||  || — || November 17, 2008 || Kitt Peak || Spacewatch || NYS || align=right | 1.7 km || 
|-id=640 bgcolor=#E9E9E9
| 239640 ||  || — || November 17, 2008 || Kitt Peak || Spacewatch || — || align=right data-sort-value="0.98" | 980 m || 
|-id=641 bgcolor=#E9E9E9
| 239641 ||  || — || November 17, 2008 || Kitt Peak || Spacewatch || — || align=right | 1.0 km || 
|-id=642 bgcolor=#E9E9E9
| 239642 ||  || — || November 17, 2008 || Kitt Peak || Spacewatch || MIS || align=right | 3.7 km || 
|-id=643 bgcolor=#d6d6d6
| 239643 ||  || — || November 17, 2008 || Kitt Peak || Spacewatch || KOR || align=right | 1.8 km || 
|-id=644 bgcolor=#E9E9E9
| 239644 ||  || — || November 19, 2008 || Kitt Peak || Spacewatch || EUN || align=right | 1.5 km || 
|-id=645 bgcolor=#d6d6d6
| 239645 Shandongas ||  ||  || November 20, 2008 || Weihai || Shandong University Obs. || — || align=right | 4.8 km || 
|-id=646 bgcolor=#fefefe
| 239646 ||  || — || November 18, 2008 || Kitt Peak || Spacewatch || — || align=right | 1.5 km || 
|-id=647 bgcolor=#E9E9E9
| 239647 ||  || — || November 18, 2008 || Kitt Peak || Spacewatch || — || align=right | 1.7 km || 
|-id=648 bgcolor=#d6d6d6
| 239648 ||  || — || November 18, 2008 || Kitt Peak || Spacewatch || — || align=right | 3.3 km || 
|-id=649 bgcolor=#E9E9E9
| 239649 ||  || — || November 18, 2008 || Kitt Peak || Spacewatch || — || align=right | 2.0 km || 
|-id=650 bgcolor=#E9E9E9
| 239650 ||  || — || November 18, 2008 || Kitt Peak || Spacewatch || — || align=right | 1.2 km || 
|-id=651 bgcolor=#fefefe
| 239651 ||  || — || November 20, 2008 || Kitt Peak || Spacewatch || FLO || align=right data-sort-value="0.83" | 830 m || 
|-id=652 bgcolor=#E9E9E9
| 239652 ||  || — || November 24, 2008 || Sierra Stars || F. Tozzi || MAR || align=right | 1.4 km || 
|-id=653 bgcolor=#d6d6d6
| 239653 ||  || — || November 21, 2008 || Catalina || CSS || EUP || align=right | 5.5 km || 
|-id=654 bgcolor=#d6d6d6
| 239654 ||  || — || November 24, 2008 || Socorro || LINEAR || THM || align=right | 3.5 km || 
|-id=655 bgcolor=#E9E9E9
| 239655 ||  || — || November 30, 2008 || Mount Lemmon || Mount Lemmon Survey || — || align=right | 2.5 km || 
|-id=656 bgcolor=#fefefe
| 239656 ||  || — || November 30, 2008 || Mount Lemmon || Mount Lemmon Survey || — || align=right | 1.6 km || 
|-id=657 bgcolor=#d6d6d6
| 239657 ||  || — || November 24, 2008 || La Sagra || OAM Obs. || — || align=right | 3.9 km || 
|-id=658 bgcolor=#E9E9E9
| 239658 ||  || — || November 30, 2008 || Kitt Peak || Spacewatch || — || align=right | 1.7 km || 
|-id=659 bgcolor=#E9E9E9
| 239659 ||  || — || November 22, 2008 || Kitt Peak || Spacewatch || AGN || align=right | 1.6 km || 
|-id=660 bgcolor=#E9E9E9
| 239660 ||  || — || November 20, 2008 || Catalina || CSS || — || align=right | 1.9 km || 
|-id=661 bgcolor=#E9E9E9
| 239661 ||  || — || November 24, 2008 || Mount Lemmon || Mount Lemmon Survey || — || align=right | 1.8 km || 
|-id=662 bgcolor=#fefefe
| 239662 ||  || — || November 30, 2008 || Kitt Peak || Spacewatch || — || align=right | 1.5 km || 
|-id=663 bgcolor=#d6d6d6
| 239663 ||  || — || November 19, 2008 || Kitt Peak || Spacewatch || THM || align=right | 2.5 km || 
|-id=664 bgcolor=#d6d6d6
| 239664 || 2008 XE || — || December 1, 2008 || Tzec Maun || L. Elenin || — || align=right | 4.7 km || 
|-id=665 bgcolor=#E9E9E9
| 239665 ||  || — || December 2, 2008 || Kitt Peak || Spacewatch || GEF || align=right | 1.8 km || 
|-id=666 bgcolor=#d6d6d6
| 239666 ||  || — || December 2, 2008 || Kitt Peak || Spacewatch || KOR || align=right | 1.6 km || 
|-id=667 bgcolor=#d6d6d6
| 239667 ||  || — || December 5, 2008 || Catalina || CSS || — || align=right | 4.9 km || 
|-id=668 bgcolor=#d6d6d6
| 239668 ||  || — || December 1, 2008 || Socorro || LINEAR || THM || align=right | 2.6 km || 
|-id=669 bgcolor=#E9E9E9
| 239669 ||  || — || December 1, 2008 || Kitt Peak || Spacewatch || — || align=right | 1.6 km || 
|-id=670 bgcolor=#d6d6d6
| 239670 ||  || — || December 3, 2008 || Mount Lemmon || Mount Lemmon Survey || — || align=right | 4.6 km || 
|-id=671 bgcolor=#E9E9E9
| 239671 ||  || — || December 3, 2008 || Mount Lemmon || Mount Lemmon Survey || — || align=right | 3.5 km || 
|-id=672 bgcolor=#d6d6d6
| 239672 SOFIA ||  ||  || December 21, 2008 || Calar Alto || F. Hormuth || 615 || align=right | 2.1 km || 
|-id=673 bgcolor=#d6d6d6
| 239673 ||  || — || December 21, 2008 || Mount Lemmon || Mount Lemmon Survey || KOR || align=right | 1.7 km || 
|-id=674 bgcolor=#E9E9E9
| 239674 ||  || — || December 18, 2008 || La Sagra || OAM Obs. || — || align=right | 2.8 km || 
|-id=675 bgcolor=#fefefe
| 239675 Mottez ||  ||  || December 26, 2008 || Saint-Sulpice || B. Christophe || — || align=right | 1.3 km || 
|-id=676 bgcolor=#E9E9E9
| 239676 ||  || — || December 30, 2008 || Purple Mountain || PMO NEO || — || align=right | 2.4 km || 
|-id=677 bgcolor=#E9E9E9
| 239677 ||  || — || December 22, 2008 || Kitt Peak || Spacewatch || GEF || align=right | 1.9 km || 
|-id=678 bgcolor=#fefefe
| 239678 ||  || — || December 29, 2008 || Mount Lemmon || Mount Lemmon Survey || NYS || align=right | 1.0 km || 
|-id=679 bgcolor=#d6d6d6
| 239679 ||  || — || December 29, 2008 || Mount Lemmon || Mount Lemmon Survey || — || align=right | 3.8 km || 
|-id=680 bgcolor=#d6d6d6
| 239680 ||  || — || December 30, 2008 || Kitt Peak || Spacewatch || — || align=right | 4.5 km || 
|-id=681 bgcolor=#E9E9E9
| 239681 ||  || — || December 30, 2008 || Mount Lemmon || Mount Lemmon Survey || — || align=right | 3.3 km || 
|-id=682 bgcolor=#E9E9E9
| 239682 ||  || — || December 30, 2008 || Mount Lemmon || Mount Lemmon Survey || — || align=right | 2.1 km || 
|-id=683 bgcolor=#d6d6d6
| 239683 ||  || — || December 30, 2008 || Mount Lemmon || Mount Lemmon Survey || — || align=right | 4.6 km || 
|-id=684 bgcolor=#d6d6d6
| 239684 ||  || — || December 30, 2008 || Kitt Peak || Spacewatch || KOR || align=right | 2.0 km || 
|-id=685 bgcolor=#E9E9E9
| 239685 ||  || — || December 29, 2008 || Kitt Peak || Spacewatch || — || align=right | 1.2 km || 
|-id=686 bgcolor=#E9E9E9
| 239686 ||  || — || December 29, 2008 || Kitt Peak || Spacewatch || — || align=right | 1.6 km || 
|-id=687 bgcolor=#E9E9E9
| 239687 ||  || — || December 29, 2008 || Kitt Peak || Spacewatch || — || align=right | 1.7 km || 
|-id=688 bgcolor=#d6d6d6
| 239688 ||  || — || December 29, 2008 || Kitt Peak || Spacewatch || — || align=right | 3.3 km || 
|-id=689 bgcolor=#d6d6d6
| 239689 ||  || — || December 29, 2008 || Kitt Peak || Spacewatch || — || align=right | 3.2 km || 
|-id=690 bgcolor=#d6d6d6
| 239690 ||  || — || December 31, 2008 || Kitt Peak || Spacewatch || — || align=right | 2.8 km || 
|-id=691 bgcolor=#E9E9E9
| 239691 ||  || — || December 30, 2008 || Kitt Peak || Spacewatch || — || align=right | 1.2 km || 
|-id=692 bgcolor=#d6d6d6
| 239692 ||  || — || December 30, 2008 || Kitt Peak || Spacewatch || SHU3:2 || align=right | 6.9 km || 
|-id=693 bgcolor=#d6d6d6
| 239693 ||  || — || December 31, 2008 || Catalina || CSS || 7:4 || align=right | 5.4 km || 
|-id=694 bgcolor=#d6d6d6
| 239694 ||  || — || December 30, 2008 || Kitt Peak || Spacewatch || — || align=right | 3.4 km || 
|-id=695 bgcolor=#E9E9E9
| 239695 ||  || — || December 30, 2008 || Kitt Peak || Spacewatch || NEM || align=right | 3.0 km || 
|-id=696 bgcolor=#d6d6d6
| 239696 ||  || — || December 30, 2008 || Kitt Peak || Spacewatch || THB || align=right | 3.6 km || 
|-id=697 bgcolor=#E9E9E9
| 239697 ||  || — || December 31, 2008 || Kitt Peak || Spacewatch || — || align=right | 1.7 km || 
|-id=698 bgcolor=#d6d6d6
| 239698 ||  || — || December 22, 2008 || Mount Lemmon || Mount Lemmon Survey || — || align=right | 3.1 km || 
|-id=699 bgcolor=#d6d6d6
| 239699 ||  || — || December 29, 2008 || Kitt Peak || Spacewatch || — || align=right | 2.7 km || 
|-id=700 bgcolor=#E9E9E9
| 239700 ||  || — || December 30, 2008 || Kitt Peak || Spacewatch || — || align=right | 2.5 km || 
|}

239701–239800 

|-bgcolor=#E9E9E9
| 239701 ||  || — || December 22, 2008 || Kitt Peak || Spacewatch || — || align=right | 2.3 km || 
|-id=702 bgcolor=#fefefe
| 239702 ||  || — || December 30, 2008 || Kitt Peak || Spacewatch || NYS || align=right | 1.9 km || 
|-id=703 bgcolor=#E9E9E9
| 239703 ||  || — || December 21, 2008 || Catalina || CSS || HOF || align=right | 3.4 km || 
|-id=704 bgcolor=#d6d6d6
| 239704 ||  || — || December 30, 2008 || Catalina || CSS || — || align=right | 4.5 km || 
|-id=705 bgcolor=#E9E9E9
| 239705 ||  || — || January 3, 2009 || Sierra Stars || F. Tozzi || EUN || align=right | 1.6 km || 
|-id=706 bgcolor=#fefefe
| 239706 ||  || — || January 3, 2009 || Dauban || F. Kugel || — || align=right | 1.5 km || 
|-id=707 bgcolor=#d6d6d6
| 239707 ||  || — || January 1, 2009 || Kitt Peak || Spacewatch || — || align=right | 4.1 km || 
|-id=708 bgcolor=#d6d6d6
| 239708 ||  || — || January 2, 2009 || Mount Lemmon || Mount Lemmon Survey || — || align=right | 2.9 km || 
|-id=709 bgcolor=#E9E9E9
| 239709 ||  || — || January 2, 2009 || Catalina || CSS || — || align=right | 1.3 km || 
|-id=710 bgcolor=#d6d6d6
| 239710 ||  || — || January 2, 2009 || Kitt Peak || Spacewatch || K-2 || align=right | 1.8 km || 
|-id=711 bgcolor=#E9E9E9
| 239711 ||  || — || January 15, 2009 || Kitt Peak || Spacewatch || — || align=right | 1.9 km || 
|-id=712 bgcolor=#E9E9E9
| 239712 ||  || — || January 15, 2009 || Kitt Peak || Spacewatch || — || align=right | 2.6 km || 
|-id=713 bgcolor=#d6d6d6
| 239713 ||  || — || January 3, 2009 || Kitt Peak || Spacewatch || — || align=right | 3.9 km || 
|-id=714 bgcolor=#d6d6d6
| 239714 ||  || — || January 2, 2009 || Mount Lemmon || Mount Lemmon Survey || 7:4 || align=right | 4.9 km || 
|-id=715 bgcolor=#d6d6d6
| 239715 ||  || — || January 19, 2009 || Mayhill || A. Lowe || THM || align=right | 3.1 km || 
|-id=716 bgcolor=#E9E9E9
| 239716 Felixbaumgartner ||  ||  || January 25, 2009 || Gaisberg || R. Gierlinger || — || align=right | 2.5 km || 
|-id=717 bgcolor=#fefefe
| 239717 ||  || — || January 16, 2009 || Mount Lemmon || Mount Lemmon Survey || — || align=right | 1.3 km || 
|-id=718 bgcolor=#E9E9E9
| 239718 ||  || — || January 16, 2009 || Mount Lemmon || Mount Lemmon Survey || — || align=right | 1.7 km || 
|-id=719 bgcolor=#d6d6d6
| 239719 ||  || — || January 16, 2009 || Kitt Peak || Spacewatch || — || align=right | 4.0 km || 
|-id=720 bgcolor=#d6d6d6
| 239720 ||  || — || January 16, 2009 || Kitt Peak || Spacewatch || — || align=right | 4.0 km || 
|-id=721 bgcolor=#d6d6d6
| 239721 ||  || — || January 16, 2009 || Mount Lemmon || Mount Lemmon Survey || — || align=right | 2.8 km || 
|-id=722 bgcolor=#d6d6d6
| 239722 ||  || — || January 16, 2009 || Mount Lemmon || Mount Lemmon Survey || — || align=right | 4.0 km || 
|-id=723 bgcolor=#d6d6d6
| 239723 ||  || — || January 16, 2009 || Mount Lemmon || Mount Lemmon Survey || HYG || align=right | 4.4 km || 
|-id=724 bgcolor=#E9E9E9
| 239724 ||  || — || January 25, 2009 || Catalina || CSS || — || align=right | 3.1 km || 
|-id=725 bgcolor=#d6d6d6
| 239725 ||  || — || January 25, 2009 || Kitt Peak || Spacewatch || — || align=right | 3.7 km || 
|-id=726 bgcolor=#d6d6d6
| 239726 ||  || — || January 26, 2009 || Kitt Peak || Spacewatch || — || align=right | 3.3 km || 
|-id=727 bgcolor=#E9E9E9
| 239727 ||  || — || January 29, 2009 || Kitt Peak || Spacewatch || WIT || align=right | 1.3 km || 
|-id=728 bgcolor=#E9E9E9
| 239728 ||  || — || January 30, 2009 || Kitt Peak || Spacewatch || PAD || align=right | 3.6 km || 
|-id=729 bgcolor=#d6d6d6
| 239729 ||  || — || January 28, 2009 || Catalina || CSS || EOS || align=right | 3.3 km || 
|-id=730 bgcolor=#d6d6d6
| 239730 ||  || — || January 16, 2009 || Kitt Peak || Spacewatch || EUP || align=right | 4.2 km || 
|-id=731 bgcolor=#d6d6d6
| 239731 ||  || — || January 20, 2009 || Catalina || CSS || ARM || align=right | 5.9 km || 
|-id=732 bgcolor=#d6d6d6
| 239732 ||  || — || January 28, 2009 || Kitt Peak || Spacewatch || EOS || align=right | 3.7 km || 
|-id=733 bgcolor=#d6d6d6
| 239733 ||  || — || February 3, 2009 || Kitt Peak || Spacewatch || — || align=right | 5.6 km || 
|-id=734 bgcolor=#E9E9E9
| 239734 ||  || — || February 2, 2009 || Mount Lemmon || Mount Lemmon Survey || AGN || align=right | 2.4 km || 
|-id=735 bgcolor=#d6d6d6
| 239735 ||  || — || February 14, 2009 || Kitt Peak || Spacewatch || ULA7:4 || align=right | 6.6 km || 
|-id=736 bgcolor=#d6d6d6
| 239736 ||  || — || February 1, 2009 || Catalina || CSS || URS || align=right | 4.1 km || 
|-id=737 bgcolor=#d6d6d6
| 239737 ||  || — || February 17, 2009 || Kitt Peak || Spacewatch || VER || align=right | 4.7 km || 
|-id=738 bgcolor=#d6d6d6
| 239738 ||  || — || February 20, 2009 || Socorro || LINEAR || — || align=right | 4.4 km || 
|-id=739 bgcolor=#d6d6d6
| 239739 ||  || — || February 20, 2009 || Kitt Peak || Spacewatch || EUP || align=right | 6.7 km || 
|-id=740 bgcolor=#d6d6d6
| 239740 ||  || — || March 14, 2009 || La Sagra || OAM Obs. || URS || align=right | 5.3 km || 
|-id=741 bgcolor=#d6d6d6
| 239741 ||  || — || March 16, 2009 || Kitt Peak || Spacewatch || — || align=right | 2.6 km || 
|-id=742 bgcolor=#d6d6d6
| 239742 ||  || — || March 25, 2009 || Sierra Stars || F. Tozzi || — || align=right | 4.9 km || 
|-id=743 bgcolor=#d6d6d6
| 239743 ||  || — || March 30, 2009 || Sierra Stars || F. Tozzi || — || align=right | 3.0 km || 
|-id=744 bgcolor=#E9E9E9
| 239744 ||  || — || November 21, 2009 || Mount Lemmon || Mount Lemmon Survey || AGN || align=right | 2.2 km || 
|-id=745 bgcolor=#fefefe
| 239745 ||  || — || December 15, 2009 || Mount Lemmon || Mount Lemmon Survey || NYS || align=right data-sort-value="0.76" | 760 m || 
|-id=746 bgcolor=#d6d6d6
| 239746 ||  || — || December 17, 2009 || Mount Lemmon || Mount Lemmon Survey || — || align=right | 3.2 km || 
|-id=747 bgcolor=#fefefe
| 239747 ||  || — || December 18, 2009 || Mount Lemmon || Mount Lemmon Survey || — || align=right data-sort-value="0.76" | 760 m || 
|-id=748 bgcolor=#fefefe
| 239748 ||  || — || December 19, 2009 || Mount Lemmon || Mount Lemmon Survey || NYS || align=right data-sort-value="0.79" | 790 m || 
|-id=749 bgcolor=#fefefe
| 239749 ||  || — || December 18, 2009 || Mount Lemmon || Mount Lemmon Survey || MAS || align=right data-sort-value="0.98" | 980 m || 
|-id=750 bgcolor=#E9E9E9
| 239750 ||  || — || January 7, 2010 || Mayhill || A. Lowe || — || align=right | 2.4 km || 
|-id=751 bgcolor=#d6d6d6
| 239751 ||  || — || January 7, 2010 || Mount Lemmon || Mount Lemmon Survey || THM || align=right | 3.0 km || 
|-id=752 bgcolor=#fefefe
| 239752 ||  || — || January 6, 2010 || Kitt Peak || Spacewatch || V || align=right | 1.1 km || 
|-id=753 bgcolor=#fefefe
| 239753 ||  || — || January 6, 2010 || Catalina || CSS || — || align=right | 1.7 km || 
|-id=754 bgcolor=#fefefe
| 239754 ||  || — || January 8, 2010 || Kitt Peak || Spacewatch || V || align=right data-sort-value="0.91" | 910 m || 
|-id=755 bgcolor=#E9E9E9
| 239755 ||  || — || January 8, 2010 || Kitt Peak || Spacewatch || — || align=right | 3.2 km || 
|-id=756 bgcolor=#fefefe
| 239756 ||  || — || January 6, 2010 || Catalina || CSS || H || align=right data-sort-value="0.82" | 820 m || 
|-id=757 bgcolor=#fefefe
| 239757 ||  || — || January 13, 2010 || Socorro || LINEAR || — || align=right | 1.9 km || 
|-id=758 bgcolor=#E9E9E9
| 239758 ||  || — || January 10, 2010 || Socorro || LINEAR || EUN || align=right | 1.8 km || 
|-id=759 bgcolor=#E9E9E9
| 239759 ||  || — || January 21, 2010 || La Sagra || OAM Obs. || BRU || align=right | 4.4 km || 
|-id=760 bgcolor=#fefefe
| 239760 ||  || — || February 6, 2010 || Mount Lemmon || Mount Lemmon Survey || FLO || align=right data-sort-value="0.80" | 800 m || 
|-id=761 bgcolor=#E9E9E9
| 239761 ||  || — || February 13, 2010 || Mayhill || iTelescope Obs. || — || align=right | 3.4 km || 
|-id=762 bgcolor=#E9E9E9
| 239762 ||  || — || February 13, 2010 || Mayhill || iTelescope Obs. || JUN || align=right | 1.1 km || 
|-id=763 bgcolor=#fefefe
| 239763 ||  || — || February 9, 2010 || Kitt Peak || Spacewatch || — || align=right data-sort-value="0.85" | 850 m || 
|-id=764 bgcolor=#d6d6d6
| 239764 ||  || — || February 9, 2010 || Kitt Peak || Spacewatch || EOS || align=right | 5.1 km || 
|-id=765 bgcolor=#E9E9E9
| 239765 ||  || — || February 10, 2010 || Kitt Peak || Spacewatch || EUN || align=right | 2.0 km || 
|-id=766 bgcolor=#E9E9E9
| 239766 ||  || — || February 13, 2010 || Kitt Peak || Spacewatch || — || align=right | 2.0 km || 
|-id=767 bgcolor=#d6d6d6
| 239767 ||  || — || February 13, 2010 || Kitt Peak || Spacewatch || — || align=right | 4.8 km || 
|-id=768 bgcolor=#d6d6d6
| 239768 ||  || — || February 7, 2010 || La Sagra || OAM Obs. || — || align=right | 4.6 km || 
|-id=769 bgcolor=#E9E9E9
| 239769 ||  || — || February 13, 2010 || Socorro || LINEAR || ADE || align=right | 3.1 km || 
|-id=770 bgcolor=#fefefe
| 239770 ||  || — || February 14, 2010 || Socorro || LINEAR || H || align=right data-sort-value="0.83" | 830 m || 
|-id=771 bgcolor=#E9E9E9
| 239771 ||  || — || February 13, 2010 || Socorro || LINEAR || — || align=right | 2.7 km || 
|-id=772 bgcolor=#d6d6d6
| 239772 ||  || — || February 9, 2010 || Catalina || CSS || — || align=right | 4.8 km || 
|-id=773 bgcolor=#E9E9E9
| 239773 ||  || — || February 9, 2010 || Kitt Peak || Spacewatch || — || align=right | 2.5 km || 
|-id=774 bgcolor=#E9E9E9
| 239774 ||  || — || February 10, 2010 || Kitt Peak || Spacewatch || — || align=right | 2.4 km || 
|-id=775 bgcolor=#E9E9E9
| 239775 ||  || — || February 12, 2010 || La Sagra || OAM Obs. || — || align=right | 4.0 km || 
|-id=776 bgcolor=#E9E9E9
| 239776 ||  || — || February 13, 2010 || Catalina || CSS || MAR || align=right | 1.8 km || 
|-id=777 bgcolor=#d6d6d6
| 239777 ||  || — || February 13, 2010 || Črni Vrh || Črni Vrh || URS || align=right | 4.9 km || 
|-id=778 bgcolor=#E9E9E9
| 239778 ||  || — || February 14, 2010 || Kitt Peak || Spacewatch || — || align=right | 2.0 km || 
|-id=779 bgcolor=#d6d6d6
| 239779 ||  || — || February 14, 2010 || Kitt Peak || Spacewatch || — || align=right | 3.3 km || 
|-id=780 bgcolor=#d6d6d6
| 239780 ||  || — || February 14, 2010 || Kitt Peak || Spacewatch || — || align=right | 2.8 km || 
|-id=781 bgcolor=#d6d6d6
| 239781 ||  || — || February 14, 2010 || Kitt Peak || Spacewatch || — || align=right | 2.6 km || 
|-id=782 bgcolor=#E9E9E9
| 239782 ||  || — || February 14, 2010 || Kitt Peak || Spacewatch || — || align=right | 2.0 km || 
|-id=783 bgcolor=#E9E9E9
| 239783 ||  || — || February 14, 2010 || Mount Lemmon || Mount Lemmon Survey || — || align=right | 2.3 km || 
|-id=784 bgcolor=#d6d6d6
| 239784 ||  || — || February 15, 2010 || Kitt Peak || Spacewatch || — || align=right | 4.8 km || 
|-id=785 bgcolor=#fefefe
| 239785 ||  || — || February 9, 2010 || Kitt Peak || Spacewatch || NYS || align=right | 1.2 km || 
|-id=786 bgcolor=#d6d6d6
| 239786 ||  || — || February 13, 2010 || Kitt Peak || Spacewatch || — || align=right | 3.1 km || 
|-id=787 bgcolor=#fefefe
| 239787 ||  || — || February 14, 2010 || Mount Lemmon || Mount Lemmon Survey || FLO || align=right | 1.0 km || 
|-id=788 bgcolor=#E9E9E9
| 239788 ||  || — || February 16, 2010 || Kitt Peak || Spacewatch || HNS || align=right | 1.8 km || 
|-id=789 bgcolor=#fefefe
| 239789 ||  || — || February 17, 2010 || Kitt Peak || Spacewatch || MAS || align=right | 1.1 km || 
|-id=790 bgcolor=#fefefe
| 239790 ||  || — || February 16, 2010 || Mount Lemmon || Mount Lemmon Survey || — || align=right | 1.3 km || 
|-id=791 bgcolor=#E9E9E9
| 239791 ||  || — || March 4, 2010 || Kitt Peak || Spacewatch || — || align=right | 1.8 km || 
|-id=792 bgcolor=#E9E9E9
| 239792 Hankakováčová ||  ||  || March 9, 2010 || LightBuckets || T. Vorobjov || HEN || align=right | 1.3 km || 
|-id=793 bgcolor=#fefefe
| 239793 ||  || — || March 4, 2010 || Kitt Peak || Spacewatch || — || align=right data-sort-value="0.86" | 860 m || 
|-id=794 bgcolor=#fefefe
| 239794 || 6715 P-L || — || September 24, 1960 || Palomar || PLS || V || align=right data-sort-value="0.85" | 850 m || 
|-id=795 bgcolor=#fefefe
| 239795 ||  || — || September 29, 1973 || Palomar || PLS || — || align=right | 1.1 km || 
|-id=796 bgcolor=#E9E9E9
| 239796 ||  || — || October 16, 1977 || Palomar || PLS || — || align=right | 2.0 km || 
|-id=797 bgcolor=#d6d6d6
| 239797 ||  || — || October 16, 1977 || Palomar || PLS || — || align=right | 3.1 km || 
|-id=798 bgcolor=#d6d6d6
| 239798 ||  || — || March 6, 1981 || Siding Spring || S. J. Bus || — || align=right | 5.0 km || 
|-id=799 bgcolor=#E9E9E9
| 239799 ||  || — || July 20, 1993 || La Silla || E. W. Elst || — || align=right | 4.1 km || 
|-id=800 bgcolor=#E9E9E9
| 239800 ||  || — || August 14, 1993 || Kitt Peak || Spacewatch || — || align=right | 2.9 km || 
|}

239801–239900 

|-bgcolor=#d6d6d6
| 239801 ||  || — || February 7, 1994 || La Silla || E. W. Elst || — || align=right | 2.4 km || 
|-id=802 bgcolor=#d6d6d6
| 239802 ||  || — || October 17, 1995 || Kitt Peak || Spacewatch || — || align=right | 2.4 km || 
|-id=803 bgcolor=#FA8072
| 239803 ||  || — || November 16, 1995 || Kitt Peak || Spacewatch || — || align=right data-sort-value="0.68" | 680 m || 
|-id=804 bgcolor=#E9E9E9
| 239804 ||  || — || November 17, 1995 || Kitt Peak || Spacewatch || — || align=right | 2.3 km || 
|-id=805 bgcolor=#E9E9E9
| 239805 ||  || — || December 14, 1995 || Kitt Peak || Spacewatch || — || align=right | 1.2 km || 
|-id=806 bgcolor=#E9E9E9
| 239806 ||  || — || April 11, 1996 || Kitt Peak || Spacewatch || GEF || align=right | 2.0 km || 
|-id=807 bgcolor=#fefefe
| 239807 || 1996 PG || — || August 7, 1996 || Prescott || P. G. Comba || V || align=right data-sort-value="0.85" | 850 m || 
|-id=808 bgcolor=#d6d6d6
| 239808 ||  || — || October 12, 1996 || Kleť || Kleť Obs. || JLI || align=right | 4.5 km || 
|-id=809 bgcolor=#E9E9E9
| 239809 ||  || — || January 10, 1997 || Oizumi || T. Kobayashi || — || align=right | 2.0 km || 
|-id=810 bgcolor=#E9E9E9
| 239810 ||  || — || March 11, 1997 || Cloudcroft || W. Offutt || — || align=right | 2.6 km || 
|-id=811 bgcolor=#E9E9E9
| 239811 ||  || — || June 28, 1997 || Socorro || LINEAR || — || align=right | 2.1 km || 
|-id=812 bgcolor=#E9E9E9
| 239812 || 1997 PP || — || August 1, 1997 || Haleakala || NEAT || — || align=right | 1.4 km || 
|-id=813 bgcolor=#fefefe
| 239813 ||  || — || October 3, 1997 || Kitt Peak || Spacewatch || FLO || align=right data-sort-value="0.64" | 640 m || 
|-id=814 bgcolor=#fefefe
| 239814 ||  || — || November 22, 1997 || Kitt Peak || Spacewatch || — || align=right | 1.2 km || 
|-id=815 bgcolor=#d6d6d6
| 239815 ||  || — || November 23, 1997 || Kitt Peak || Spacewatch || KOR || align=right | 1.6 km || 
|-id=816 bgcolor=#fefefe
| 239816 ||  || — || January 18, 1998 || Kitt Peak || Spacewatch || — || align=right | 1.1 km || 
|-id=817 bgcolor=#fefefe
| 239817 ||  || — || January 31, 1998 || Kleť || Kleť Obs. || ERI || align=right | 2.8 km || 
|-id=818 bgcolor=#E9E9E9
| 239818 ||  || — || March 24, 1998 || Socorro || LINEAR || — || align=right | 4.0 km || 
|-id=819 bgcolor=#E9E9E9
| 239819 ||  || — || June 24, 1998 || Kitt Peak || Spacewatch || — || align=right | 1.6 km || 
|-id=820 bgcolor=#E9E9E9
| 239820 ||  || — || July 16, 1998 || Kitt Peak || Spacewatch || — || align=right | 1.3 km || 
|-id=821 bgcolor=#E9E9E9
| 239821 ||  || — || September 13, 1998 || Kitt Peak || Spacewatch || EUN || align=right | 1.7 km || 
|-id=822 bgcolor=#E9E9E9
| 239822 ||  || — || September 14, 1998 || Socorro || LINEAR || — || align=right | 3.5 km || 
|-id=823 bgcolor=#fefefe
| 239823 ||  || — || September 14, 1998 || Socorro || LINEAR || — || align=right | 1.1 km || 
|-id=824 bgcolor=#E9E9E9
| 239824 ||  || — || September 26, 1998 || Kitt Peak || Spacewatch || — || align=right | 2.6 km || 
|-id=825 bgcolor=#FA8072
| 239825 ||  || — || September 26, 1998 || Socorro || LINEAR || — || align=right data-sort-value="0.89" | 890 m || 
|-id=826 bgcolor=#E9E9E9
| 239826 ||  || — || October 18, 1998 || La Silla || E. W. Elst || — || align=right | 5.0 km || 
|-id=827 bgcolor=#E9E9E9
| 239827 ||  || — || November 10, 1998 || Socorro || LINEAR || — || align=right | 2.7 km || 
|-id=828 bgcolor=#E9E9E9
| 239828 ||  || — || November 15, 1998 || Kitt Peak || Spacewatch || — || align=right | 2.6 km || 
|-id=829 bgcolor=#E9E9E9
| 239829 ||  || — || November 23, 1998 || Kitt Peak || Spacewatch || — || align=right | 3.4 km || 
|-id=830 bgcolor=#E9E9E9
| 239830 ||  || — || December 8, 1998 || Kitt Peak || Spacewatch || — || align=right | 3.7 km || 
|-id=831 bgcolor=#fefefe
| 239831 ||  || — || December 17, 1998 || Caussols || ODAS || — || align=right data-sort-value="0.99" | 990 m || 
|-id=832 bgcolor=#FA8072
| 239832 ||  || — || December 23, 1998 || Kitt Peak || Spacewatch || — || align=right | 1.9 km || 
|-id=833 bgcolor=#fefefe
| 239833 ||  || — || January 19, 1999 || Kitt Peak || Spacewatch || FLO || align=right data-sort-value="0.87" | 870 m || 
|-id=834 bgcolor=#fefefe
| 239834 ||  || — || March 14, 1999 || Kitt Peak || Spacewatch || MAS || align=right data-sort-value="0.83" | 830 m || 
|-id=835 bgcolor=#d6d6d6
| 239835 ||  || — || March 16, 1999 || Kitt Peak || Spacewatch || — || align=right | 2.6 km || 
|-id=836 bgcolor=#d6d6d6
| 239836 ||  || — || March 20, 1999 || Apache Point || SDSS || URS || align=right | 6.6 km || 
|-id=837 bgcolor=#d6d6d6
| 239837 ||  || — || March 21, 1999 || Apache Point || SDSS || — || align=right | 4.6 km || 
|-id=838 bgcolor=#fefefe
| 239838 ||  || — || April 12, 1999 || Socorro || LINEAR || — || align=right | 3.3 km || 
|-id=839 bgcolor=#d6d6d6
| 239839 ||  || — || June 8, 1999 || Socorro || LINEAR || Tj (2.97) || align=right | 5.2 km || 
|-id=840 bgcolor=#fefefe
| 239840 ||  || — || July 12, 1999 || Socorro || LINEAR || — || align=right | 3.4 km || 
|-id=841 bgcolor=#fefefe
| 239841 ||  || — || September 11, 1999 || Socorro || LINEAR || — || align=right | 1.1 km || 
|-id=842 bgcolor=#E9E9E9
| 239842 ||  || — || September 30, 1999 || Kitt Peak || Spacewatch || — || align=right | 1.0 km || 
|-id=843 bgcolor=#E9E9E9
| 239843 ||  || — || October 9, 1999 || Kitt Peak || Spacewatch || — || align=right | 2.6 km || 
|-id=844 bgcolor=#d6d6d6
| 239844 ||  || — || October 6, 1999 || Socorro || LINEAR || — || align=right | 3.5 km || 
|-id=845 bgcolor=#d6d6d6
| 239845 ||  || — || October 6, 1999 || Socorro || LINEAR || SHU3:2 || align=right | 9.2 km || 
|-id=846 bgcolor=#E9E9E9
| 239846 ||  || — || October 10, 1999 || Socorro || LINEAR || — || align=right | 2.3 km || 
|-id=847 bgcolor=#E9E9E9
| 239847 ||  || — || October 12, 1999 || Socorro || LINEAR || — || align=right | 2.9 km || 
|-id=848 bgcolor=#d6d6d6
| 239848 ||  || — || October 2, 1999 || Catalina || CSS || TIR || align=right | 2.5 km || 
|-id=849 bgcolor=#FFC2E0
| 239849 ||  || — || November 7, 1999 || Socorro || LINEAR || APOcritical || align=right data-sort-value="0.45" | 450 m || 
|-id=850 bgcolor=#d6d6d6
| 239850 ||  || — || November 5, 1999 || Socorro || LINEAR || EUP || align=right | 7.1 km || 
|-id=851 bgcolor=#E9E9E9
| 239851 ||  || — || November 9, 1999 || Kitt Peak || Spacewatch || ADE || align=right | 3.3 km || 
|-id=852 bgcolor=#E9E9E9
| 239852 ||  || — || November 15, 1999 || Socorro || LINEAR || JUN || align=right | 1.8 km || 
|-id=853 bgcolor=#E9E9E9
| 239853 ||  || — || November 4, 1999 || Kitt Peak || Spacewatch || — || align=right | 2.3 km || 
|-id=854 bgcolor=#E9E9E9
| 239854 ||  || — || November 1, 1999 || Kitt Peak || Spacewatch || — || align=right data-sort-value="0.92" | 920 m || 
|-id=855 bgcolor=#E9E9E9
| 239855 ||  || — || November 30, 1999 || Kitt Peak || Spacewatch || — || align=right | 3.3 km || 
|-id=856 bgcolor=#E9E9E9
| 239856 ||  || — || December 6, 1999 || Socorro || LINEAR || EUN || align=right | 1.9 km || 
|-id=857 bgcolor=#E9E9E9
| 239857 ||  || — || December 7, 1999 || Socorro || LINEAR || JUN || align=right | 1.6 km || 
|-id=858 bgcolor=#E9E9E9
| 239858 ||  || — || December 7, 1999 || Kitt Peak || Spacewatch || — || align=right | 2.0 km || 
|-id=859 bgcolor=#E9E9E9
| 239859 ||  || — || December 14, 1999 || Socorro || LINEAR || ADE || align=right | 3.9 km || 
|-id=860 bgcolor=#E9E9E9
| 239860 ||  || — || December 31, 1999 || Kitt Peak || Spacewatch || — || align=right | 2.1 km || 
|-id=861 bgcolor=#E9E9E9
| 239861 ||  || — || January 5, 2000 || Socorro || LINEAR || — || align=right | 3.2 km || 
|-id=862 bgcolor=#E9E9E9
| 239862 ||  || — || January 8, 2000 || Kitt Peak || Spacewatch || — || align=right | 2.0 km || 
|-id=863 bgcolor=#fefefe
| 239863 ||  || — || January 10, 2000 || Kitt Peak || Spacewatch || — || align=right data-sort-value="0.94" | 940 m || 
|-id=864 bgcolor=#E9E9E9
| 239864 ||  || — || January 29, 2000 || Kitt Peak || Spacewatch || MRX || align=right | 1.6 km || 
|-id=865 bgcolor=#E9E9E9
| 239865 ||  || — || February 2, 2000 || Socorro || LINEAR || — || align=right | 3.7 km || 
|-id=866 bgcolor=#E9E9E9
| 239866 ||  || — || February 8, 2000 || Kitt Peak || Spacewatch || — || align=right | 2.8 km || 
|-id=867 bgcolor=#E9E9E9
| 239867 ||  || — || February 3, 2000 || Socorro || LINEAR || — || align=right | 3.2 km || 
|-id=868 bgcolor=#fefefe
| 239868 ||  || — || March 10, 2000 || Kitt Peak || Spacewatch || FLO || align=right data-sort-value="0.80" | 800 m || 
|-id=869 bgcolor=#fefefe
| 239869 ||  || — || April 5, 2000 || Socorro || LINEAR || — || align=right | 1.2 km || 
|-id=870 bgcolor=#fefefe
| 239870 ||  || — || April 26, 2000 || Kitt Peak || Spacewatch || FLO || align=right data-sort-value="0.73" | 730 m || 
|-id=871 bgcolor=#fefefe
| 239871 ||  || — || April 29, 2000 || Socorro || LINEAR || — || align=right | 1.3 km || 
|-id=872 bgcolor=#fefefe
| 239872 ||  || — || May 5, 2000 || Socorro || LINEAR || — || align=right | 1.0 km || 
|-id=873 bgcolor=#d6d6d6
| 239873 ||  || — || May 5, 2000 || Kitt Peak || Spacewatch || — || align=right | 5.2 km || 
|-id=874 bgcolor=#FA8072
| 239874 ||  || — || May 6, 2000 || Socorro || LINEAR || — || align=right data-sort-value="0.96" | 960 m || 
|-id=875 bgcolor=#FA8072
| 239875 ||  || — || May 27, 2000 || Socorro || LINEAR || — || align=right | 1.2 km || 
|-id=876 bgcolor=#fefefe
| 239876 ||  || — || July 4, 2000 || Prescott || P. G. Comba || V || align=right data-sort-value="0.99" | 990 m || 
|-id=877 bgcolor=#fefefe
| 239877 ||  || — || July 3, 2000 || Kitt Peak || Spacewatch || — || align=right | 1.2 km || 
|-id=878 bgcolor=#d6d6d6
| 239878 ||  || — || July 30, 2000 || Socorro || LINEAR || — || align=right | 4.9 km || 
|-id=879 bgcolor=#fefefe
| 239879 ||  || — || August 1, 2000 || Socorro || LINEAR || V || align=right | 1.1 km || 
|-id=880 bgcolor=#fefefe
| 239880 ||  || — || August 28, 2000 || Višnjan Observatory || K. Korlević || — || align=right | 1.3 km || 
|-id=881 bgcolor=#FA8072
| 239881 ||  || — || August 25, 2000 || Socorro || LINEAR || — || align=right | 1.2 km || 
|-id=882 bgcolor=#d6d6d6
| 239882 ||  || — || August 28, 2000 || Socorro || LINEAR || — || align=right | 5.4 km || 
|-id=883 bgcolor=#fefefe
| 239883 ||  || — || August 25, 2000 || Socorro || LINEAR || — || align=right | 1.3 km || 
|-id=884 bgcolor=#fefefe
| 239884 ||  || — || August 25, 2000 || Socorro || LINEAR || — || align=right data-sort-value="0.97" | 970 m || 
|-id=885 bgcolor=#fefefe
| 239885 ||  || — || August 31, 2000 || Socorro || LINEAR || — || align=right | 2.7 km || 
|-id=886 bgcolor=#fefefe
| 239886 ||  || — || August 31, 2000 || Socorro || LINEAR || V || align=right data-sort-value="0.88" | 880 m || 
|-id=887 bgcolor=#fefefe
| 239887 ||  || — || August 31, 2000 || Socorro || LINEAR || — || align=right | 1.5 km || 
|-id=888 bgcolor=#fefefe
| 239888 ||  || — || August 31, 2000 || Socorro || LINEAR || ERI || align=right | 3.1 km || 
|-id=889 bgcolor=#fefefe
| 239889 ||  || — || September 1, 2000 || Socorro || LINEAR || H || align=right data-sort-value="0.89" | 890 m || 
|-id=890 bgcolor=#fefefe
| 239890 Edudeldon ||  ||  || September 1, 2000 || Saltsjöbaden || A. Brandeker || NYS || align=right data-sort-value="0.86" | 860 m || 
|-id=891 bgcolor=#d6d6d6
| 239891 ||  || — || September 1, 2000 || Socorro || LINEAR || — || align=right | 6.0 km || 
|-id=892 bgcolor=#d6d6d6
| 239892 ||  || — || September 1, 2000 || Socorro || LINEAR || HYG || align=right | 4.2 km || 
|-id=893 bgcolor=#fefefe
| 239893 ||  || — || September 3, 2000 || Socorro || LINEAR || V || align=right data-sort-value="0.87" | 870 m || 
|-id=894 bgcolor=#d6d6d6
| 239894 ||  || — || September 3, 2000 || Socorro || LINEAR || — || align=right | 5.2 km || 
|-id=895 bgcolor=#d6d6d6
| 239895 ||  || — || September 24, 2000 || Socorro || LINEAR || HYG || align=right | 4.1 km || 
|-id=896 bgcolor=#fefefe
| 239896 ||  || — || September 23, 2000 || Socorro || LINEAR || — || align=right | 2.4 km || 
|-id=897 bgcolor=#d6d6d6
| 239897 ||  || — || September 24, 2000 || Socorro || LINEAR || — || align=right | 3.7 km || 
|-id=898 bgcolor=#fefefe
| 239898 ||  || — || September 24, 2000 || Socorro || LINEAR || NYS || align=right data-sort-value="0.88" | 880 m || 
|-id=899 bgcolor=#fefefe
| 239899 ||  || — || September 24, 2000 || Socorro || LINEAR || NYS || align=right data-sort-value="0.95" | 950 m || 
|-id=900 bgcolor=#fefefe
| 239900 ||  || — || September 24, 2000 || Socorro || LINEAR || — || align=right | 1.3 km || 
|}

239901–240000 

|-bgcolor=#d6d6d6
| 239901 ||  || — || September 24, 2000 || Socorro || LINEAR || — || align=right | 4.4 km || 
|-id=902 bgcolor=#fefefe
| 239902 ||  || — || September 24, 2000 || Socorro || LINEAR || — || align=right | 1.2 km || 
|-id=903 bgcolor=#C2FFFF
| 239903 ||  || — || September 26, 2000 || Socorro || LINEAR || L5 || align=right | 12 km || 
|-id=904 bgcolor=#d6d6d6
| 239904 ||  || — || September 23, 2000 || Socorro || LINEAR || ALA || align=right | 5.4 km || 
|-id=905 bgcolor=#fefefe
| 239905 ||  || — || September 24, 2000 || Socorro || LINEAR || — || align=right | 1.1 km || 
|-id=906 bgcolor=#d6d6d6
| 239906 ||  || — || September 20, 2000 || Haleakala || NEAT || — || align=right | 5.1 km || 
|-id=907 bgcolor=#fefefe
| 239907 ||  || — || September 26, 2000 || Socorro || LINEAR || H || align=right data-sort-value="0.76" | 760 m || 
|-id=908 bgcolor=#d6d6d6
| 239908 ||  || — || September 27, 2000 || Socorro || LINEAR || 7:4 || align=right | 4.8 km || 
|-id=909 bgcolor=#d6d6d6
| 239909 ||  || — || September 21, 2000 || Socorro || LINEAR || — || align=right | 3.9 km || 
|-id=910 bgcolor=#fefefe
| 239910 ||  || — || September 26, 2000 || Socorro || LINEAR || PHO || align=right | 4.3 km || 
|-id=911 bgcolor=#d6d6d6
| 239911 ||  || — || September 24, 2000 || Socorro || LINEAR || — || align=right | 4.3 km || 
|-id=912 bgcolor=#fefefe
| 239912 ||  || — || September 24, 2000 || Socorro || LINEAR || NYS || align=right data-sort-value="0.82" | 820 m || 
|-id=913 bgcolor=#d6d6d6
| 239913 ||  || — || September 23, 2000 || Socorro || LINEAR || — || align=right | 4.2 km || 
|-id=914 bgcolor=#fefefe
| 239914 ||  || — || September 28, 2000 || Kitt Peak || Spacewatch || — || align=right data-sort-value="0.99" | 990 m || 
|-id=915 bgcolor=#d6d6d6
| 239915 ||  || — || September 26, 2000 || Haleakala || NEAT || — || align=right | 4.9 km || 
|-id=916 bgcolor=#fefefe
| 239916 ||  || — || September 25, 2000 || Haleakala || NEAT || FLO || align=right data-sort-value="0.83" | 830 m || 
|-id=917 bgcolor=#d6d6d6
| 239917 ||  || — || October 1, 2000 || Socorro || LINEAR || — || align=right | 4.1 km || 
|-id=918 bgcolor=#d6d6d6
| 239918 ||  || — || October 1, 2000 || Socorro || LINEAR || THB || align=right | 4.9 km || 
|-id=919 bgcolor=#d6d6d6
| 239919 ||  || — || October 1, 2000 || Anderson Mesa || LONEOS || — || align=right | 4.7 km || 
|-id=920 bgcolor=#d6d6d6
| 239920 ||  || — || October 2, 2000 || Socorro || LINEAR || — || align=right | 5.0 km || 
|-id=921 bgcolor=#E9E9E9
| 239921 ||  || — || October 24, 2000 || Socorro || LINEAR || MIT || align=right | 4.5 km || 
|-id=922 bgcolor=#fefefe
| 239922 ||  || — || October 26, 2000 || Socorro || LINEAR || H || align=right data-sort-value="0.97" | 970 m || 
|-id=923 bgcolor=#fefefe
| 239923 ||  || — || October 24, 2000 || Socorro || LINEAR || — || align=right | 1.0 km || 
|-id=924 bgcolor=#fefefe
| 239924 ||  || — || October 24, 2000 || Socorro || LINEAR || ERI || align=right | 2.4 km || 
|-id=925 bgcolor=#E9E9E9
| 239925 ||  || — || October 24, 2000 || Socorro || LINEAR || — || align=right | 3.8 km || 
|-id=926 bgcolor=#d6d6d6
| 239926 ||  || — || October 24, 2000 || Socorro || LINEAR || — || align=right | 3.9 km || 
|-id=927 bgcolor=#fefefe
| 239927 ||  || — || October 31, 2000 || Socorro || LINEAR || MAS || align=right | 1.2 km || 
|-id=928 bgcolor=#fefefe
| 239928 ||  || — || November 21, 2000 || Socorro || LINEAR || H || align=right data-sort-value="0.74" | 740 m || 
|-id=929 bgcolor=#fefefe
| 239929 ||  || — || November 21, 2000 || Socorro || LINEAR || — || align=right | 1.3 km || 
|-id=930 bgcolor=#fefefe
| 239930 ||  || — || November 21, 2000 || Socorro || LINEAR || V || align=right data-sort-value="0.97" | 970 m || 
|-id=931 bgcolor=#fefefe
| 239931 ||  || — || November 20, 2000 || Socorro || LINEAR || — || align=right | 2.8 km || 
|-id=932 bgcolor=#E9E9E9
| 239932 ||  || — || November 19, 2000 || Anderson Mesa || LONEOS || — || align=right | 2.2 km || 
|-id=933 bgcolor=#E9E9E9
| 239933 ||  || — || December 1, 2000 || Socorro || LINEAR || — || align=right | 1.5 km || 
|-id=934 bgcolor=#d6d6d6
| 239934 ||  || — || December 5, 2000 || Socorro || LINEAR || — || align=right | 7.5 km || 
|-id=935 bgcolor=#E9E9E9
| 239935 ||  || — || December 30, 2000 || Socorro || LINEAR || — || align=right | 1.6 km || 
|-id=936 bgcolor=#E9E9E9
| 239936 ||  || — || December 30, 2000 || Socorro || LINEAR || BRG || align=right | 2.8 km || 
|-id=937 bgcolor=#d6d6d6
| 239937 ||  || — || December 30, 2000 || Socorro || LINEAR || TIR || align=right | 6.5 km || 
|-id=938 bgcolor=#E9E9E9
| 239938 ||  || — || January 2, 2001 || Socorro || LINEAR || — || align=right | 3.5 km || 
|-id=939 bgcolor=#d6d6d6
| 239939 ||  || — || January 4, 2001 || Socorro || LINEAR || EUP || align=right | 6.5 km || 
|-id=940 bgcolor=#E9E9E9
| 239940 ||  || — || January 21, 2001 || Socorro || LINEAR || — || align=right | 1.8 km || 
|-id=941 bgcolor=#E9E9E9
| 239941 ||  || — || January 18, 2001 || Socorro || LINEAR || — || align=right | 2.5 km || 
|-id=942 bgcolor=#E9E9E9
| 239942 ||  || — || February 1, 2001 || Socorro || LINEAR || — || align=right | 1.3 km || 
|-id=943 bgcolor=#E9E9E9
| 239943 ||  || — || February 1, 2001 || Kitt Peak || Spacewatch || — || align=right | 1.2 km || 
|-id=944 bgcolor=#E9E9E9
| 239944 ||  || — || February 2, 2001 || Anderson Mesa || LONEOS || — || align=right | 2.4 km || 
|-id=945 bgcolor=#E9E9E9
| 239945 ||  || — || February 13, 2001 || Socorro || LINEAR || BRG || align=right | 2.4 km || 
|-id=946 bgcolor=#E9E9E9
| 239946 ||  || — || February 15, 2001 || Socorro || LINEAR || — || align=right | 2.2 km || 
|-id=947 bgcolor=#E9E9E9
| 239947 ||  || — || February 19, 2001 || Socorro || LINEAR || MAR || align=right | 1.6 km || 
|-id=948 bgcolor=#E9E9E9
| 239948 ||  || — || February 27, 2001 || Kitt Peak || Spacewatch || — || align=right | 1.2 km || 
|-id=949 bgcolor=#E9E9E9
| 239949 ||  || — || February 19, 2001 || Kitt Peak || Spacewatch || EUN || align=right | 1.7 km || 
|-id=950 bgcolor=#E9E9E9
| 239950 ||  || — || March 2, 2001 || Anderson Mesa || LONEOS || EUN || align=right | 2.3 km || 
|-id=951 bgcolor=#E9E9E9
| 239951 ||  || — || March 19, 2001 || Anderson Mesa || LONEOS || — || align=right | 3.3 km || 
|-id=952 bgcolor=#E9E9E9
| 239952 ||  || — || March 19, 2001 || Socorro || LINEAR || — || align=right | 2.4 km || 
|-id=953 bgcolor=#E9E9E9
| 239953 ||  || — || March 16, 2001 || Socorro || LINEAR || — || align=right | 3.1 km || 
|-id=954 bgcolor=#E9E9E9
| 239954 ||  || — || March 28, 2001 || Kitt Peak || Spacewatch || — || align=right | 2.2 km || 
|-id=955 bgcolor=#E9E9E9
| 239955 ||  || — || March 24, 2001 || Anderson Mesa || LONEOS || — || align=right | 2.0 km || 
|-id=956 bgcolor=#E9E9E9
| 239956 ||  || — || March 16, 2001 || Socorro || LINEAR || MAR || align=right | 1.8 km || 
|-id=957 bgcolor=#E9E9E9
| 239957 ||  || — || April 13, 2001 || Socorro || LINEAR || BAR || align=right | 2.3 km || 
|-id=958 bgcolor=#E9E9E9
| 239958 ||  || — || April 15, 2001 || Socorro || LINEAR || — || align=right | 3.8 km || 
|-id=959 bgcolor=#E9E9E9
| 239959 ||  || — || April 15, 2001 || Haleakala || NEAT || JUN || align=right | 1.8 km || 
|-id=960 bgcolor=#E9E9E9
| 239960 ||  || — || April 29, 2001 || Socorro || LINEAR || — || align=right | 3.3 km || 
|-id=961 bgcolor=#E9E9E9
| 239961 ||  || — || May 15, 2001 || Anderson Mesa || LONEOS || — || align=right | 3.3 km || 
|-id=962 bgcolor=#E9E9E9
| 239962 ||  || — || May 16, 2001 || Palomar || NEAT || — || align=right | 1.6 km || 
|-id=963 bgcolor=#E9E9E9
| 239963 ||  || — || June 18, 2001 || Wise || Wise Obs. || PAE || align=right | 2.9 km || 
|-id=964 bgcolor=#E9E9E9
| 239964 ||  || — || June 19, 2001 || Palomar || NEAT || — || align=right | 3.4 km || 
|-id=965 bgcolor=#d6d6d6
| 239965 ||  || — || July 14, 2001 || Emerald Lane || L. Ball || — || align=right | 6.3 km || 
|-id=966 bgcolor=#E9E9E9
| 239966 ||  || — || July 18, 2001 || Haleakala || NEAT || — || align=right | 1.6 km || 
|-id=967 bgcolor=#fefefe
| 239967 ||  || — || August 7, 2001 || Haleakala || NEAT || — || align=right | 1.1 km || 
|-id=968 bgcolor=#fefefe
| 239968 ||  || — || August 10, 2001 || Palomar || NEAT || — || align=right | 2.5 km || 
|-id=969 bgcolor=#fefefe
| 239969 ||  || — || August 10, 2001 || Palomar || NEAT || — || align=right | 1.1 km || 
|-id=970 bgcolor=#fefefe
| 239970 ||  || — || August 16, 2001 || Socorro || LINEAR || — || align=right | 1.1 km || 
|-id=971 bgcolor=#fefefe
| 239971 ||  || — || August 19, 2001 || Socorro || LINEAR || — || align=right | 1.2 km || 
|-id=972 bgcolor=#fefefe
| 239972 ||  || — || August 23, 2001 || Anderson Mesa || LONEOS || FLO || align=right data-sort-value="0.89" | 890 m || 
|-id=973 bgcolor=#d6d6d6
| 239973 ||  || — || August 24, 2001 || Anderson Mesa || LONEOS || — || align=right | 5.1 km || 
|-id=974 bgcolor=#FA8072
| 239974 ||  || — || August 25, 2001 || Socorro || LINEAR || H || align=right data-sort-value="0.93" | 930 m || 
|-id=975 bgcolor=#fefefe
| 239975 ||  || — || August 19, 2001 || Kvistaberg || UDAS || FLO || align=right data-sort-value="0.91" | 910 m || 
|-id=976 bgcolor=#d6d6d6
| 239976 ||  || — || August 22, 2001 || Kiso || Y. Ohba || HYG || align=right | 4.8 km || 
|-id=977 bgcolor=#d6d6d6
| 239977 ||  || — || August 23, 2001 || Anderson Mesa || LONEOS || — || align=right | 6.3 km || 
|-id=978 bgcolor=#d6d6d6
| 239978 ||  || — || August 25, 2001 || Anderson Mesa || LONEOS || — || align=right | 5.4 km || 
|-id=979 bgcolor=#d6d6d6
| 239979 ||  || — || September 7, 2001 || Socorro || LINEAR || TRP || align=right | 3.3 km || 
|-id=980 bgcolor=#fefefe
| 239980 ||  || — || September 11, 2001 || Kitt Peak || Spacewatch || FLO || align=right data-sort-value="0.74" | 740 m || 
|-id=981 bgcolor=#fefefe
| 239981 ||  || — || September 12, 2001 || Socorro || LINEAR || — || align=right | 1.1 km || 
|-id=982 bgcolor=#fefefe
| 239982 ||  || — || September 12, 2001 || Socorro || LINEAR || — || align=right | 1.1 km || 
|-id=983 bgcolor=#E9E9E9
| 239983 ||  || — || September 12, 2001 || Socorro || LINEAR || — || align=right | 2.5 km || 
|-id=984 bgcolor=#d6d6d6
| 239984 ||  || — || September 12, 2001 || Socorro || LINEAR || — || align=right | 3.2 km || 
|-id=985 bgcolor=#fefefe
| 239985 ||  || — || September 12, 2001 || Socorro || LINEAR || — || align=right data-sort-value="0.85" | 850 m || 
|-id=986 bgcolor=#E9E9E9
| 239986 ||  || — || September 12, 2001 || Socorro || LINEAR || HOF || align=right | 3.2 km || 
|-id=987 bgcolor=#d6d6d6
| 239987 ||  || — || September 12, 2001 || Socorro || LINEAR || HYG || align=right | 5.1 km || 
|-id=988 bgcolor=#d6d6d6
| 239988 ||  || — || September 12, 2001 || Kitt Peak || Spacewatch || — || align=right | 4.6 km || 
|-id=989 bgcolor=#fefefe
| 239989 ||  || — || September 18, 2001 || Kitt Peak || Spacewatch || FLO || align=right data-sort-value="0.79" | 790 m || 
|-id=990 bgcolor=#d6d6d6
| 239990 ||  || — || September 18, 2001 || Kitt Peak || Spacewatch || — || align=right | 3.9 km || 
|-id=991 bgcolor=#fefefe
| 239991 ||  || — || September 16, 2001 || Socorro || LINEAR || FLO || align=right data-sort-value="0.72" | 720 m || 
|-id=992 bgcolor=#d6d6d6
| 239992 ||  || — || September 16, 2001 || Socorro || LINEAR || HYG || align=right | 5.3 km || 
|-id=993 bgcolor=#d6d6d6
| 239993 ||  || — || September 20, 2001 || Socorro || LINEAR || — || align=right | 5.5 km || 
|-id=994 bgcolor=#fefefe
| 239994 ||  || — || September 20, 2001 || Socorro || LINEAR || FLO || align=right data-sort-value="0.71" | 710 m || 
|-id=995 bgcolor=#d6d6d6
| 239995 ||  || — || September 19, 2001 || Socorro || LINEAR || — || align=right | 3.4 km || 
|-id=996 bgcolor=#fefefe
| 239996 ||  || — || September 19, 2001 || Socorro || LINEAR || — || align=right data-sort-value="0.80" | 800 m || 
|-id=997 bgcolor=#d6d6d6
| 239997 ||  || — || September 19, 2001 || Socorro || LINEAR || — || align=right | 3.1 km || 
|-id=998 bgcolor=#fefefe
| 239998 ||  || — || September 19, 2001 || Socorro || LINEAR || — || align=right | 1.1 km || 
|-id=999 bgcolor=#d6d6d6
| 239999 ||  || — || September 19, 2001 || Socorro || LINEAR || — || align=right | 3.8 km || 
|-id=000 bgcolor=#d6d6d6
| 240000 ||  || — || September 19, 2001 || Socorro || LINEAR || 7:4 || align=right | 5.6 km || 
|}

References

External links 
 Discovery Circumstances: Numbered Minor Planets (235001)–(240000) (IAU Minor Planet Center)

0239